

161001–161100 

|-bgcolor=#FA8072
| 161001 ||  || — || February 6, 2002 || Palomar || NEAT || — || align=right | 1.7 km || 
|-id=002 bgcolor=#fefefe
| 161002 ||  || — || February 11, 2002 || Socorro || LINEAR || V || align=right | 1.2 km || 
|-id=003 bgcolor=#C2FFFF
| 161003 ||  || — || February 19, 2002 || Socorro || LINEAR || L4 || align=right | 20 km || 
|-id=004 bgcolor=#fefefe
| 161004 ||  || — || February 19, 2002 || Socorro || LINEAR || H || align=right | 1.1 km || 
|-id=005 bgcolor=#fefefe
| 161005 ||  || — || February 16, 2002 || Palomar || NEAT || — || align=right | 1.4 km || 
|-id=006 bgcolor=#fefefe
| 161006 ||  || — || March 10, 2002 || Fountain Hills || C. W. Juels, P. R. Holvorcem || NYS || align=right | 1.5 km || 
|-id=007 bgcolor=#fefefe
| 161007 ||  || — || March 10, 2002 || Haleakala || NEAT || MAS || align=right data-sort-value="0.90" | 900 m || 
|-id=008 bgcolor=#fefefe
| 161008 ||  || — || March 9, 2002 || Socorro || LINEAR || NYS || align=right | 1.4 km || 
|-id=009 bgcolor=#fefefe
| 161009 ||  || — || March 12, 2002 || Socorro || LINEAR || FLO || align=right | 1.3 km || 
|-id=010 bgcolor=#E9E9E9
| 161010 ||  || — || March 11, 2002 || Palomar || NEAT || — || align=right | 1.8 km || 
|-id=011 bgcolor=#d6d6d6
| 161011 ||  || — || March 12, 2002 || Palomar || NEAT || — || align=right | 3.3 km || 
|-id=012 bgcolor=#E9E9E9
| 161012 ||  || — || March 13, 2002 || Socorro || LINEAR || — || align=right | 1.7 km || 
|-id=013 bgcolor=#E9E9E9
| 161013 ||  || — || March 13, 2002 || Socorro || LINEAR || — || align=right | 2.0 km || 
|-id=014 bgcolor=#fefefe
| 161014 ||  || — || March 13, 2002 || Palomar || NEAT || FLO || align=right | 1.3 km || 
|-id=015 bgcolor=#fefefe
| 161015 ||  || — || March 9, 2002 || Socorro || LINEAR || NYS || align=right | 1.4 km || 
|-id=016 bgcolor=#E9E9E9
| 161016 ||  || — || March 13, 2002 || Socorro || LINEAR || — || align=right | 4.5 km || 
|-id=017 bgcolor=#C2FFFF
| 161017 ||  || — || March 9, 2002 || Anderson Mesa || LONEOS || L4 || align=right | 14 km || 
|-id=018 bgcolor=#C2FFFF
| 161018 ||  || — || March 10, 2002 || Haleakala || NEAT || L4 || align=right | 19 km || 
|-id=019 bgcolor=#fefefe
| 161019 ||  || — || March 10, 2002 || Haleakala || NEAT || — || align=right | 1.7 km || 
|-id=020 bgcolor=#C2FFFF
| 161020 ||  || — || March 5, 2002 || Apache Point || SDSS || L4 || align=right | 11 km || 
|-id=021 bgcolor=#E9E9E9
| 161021 ||  || — || March 10, 2002 || Bohyunsan || Bohyunsan Obs. || — || align=right | 1.3 km || 
|-id=022 bgcolor=#fefefe
| 161022 ||  || — || March 14, 2002 || Palomar || NEAT || — || align=right | 4.0 km || 
|-id=023 bgcolor=#fefefe
| 161023 ||  || — || March 19, 2002 || Desert Eagle || W. K. Y. Yeung || — || align=right | 1.6 km || 
|-id=024 bgcolor=#C2FFFF
| 161024 ||  || — || March 23, 2002 || Uccle || T. Pauwels || L4 || align=right | 18 km || 
|-id=025 bgcolor=#fefefe
| 161025 ||  || — || March 16, 2002 || Socorro || LINEAR || — || align=right | 1.8 km || 
|-id=026 bgcolor=#fefefe
| 161026 ||  || — || March 21, 2002 || Palomar || NEAT || FLO || align=right | 1.4 km || 
|-id=027 bgcolor=#C2FFFF
| 161027 ||  || — || March 30, 2002 || Palomar || NEAT || L4 || align=right | 15 km || 
|-id=028 bgcolor=#d6d6d6
| 161028 ||  || — || April 14, 2002 || Desert Eagle || W. K. Y. Yeung || EOS || align=right | 3.4 km || 
|-id=029 bgcolor=#fefefe
| 161029 ||  || — || April 4, 2002 || Palomar || NEAT || V || align=right | 1.5 km || 
|-id=030 bgcolor=#d6d6d6
| 161030 ||  || — || April 8, 2002 || Palomar || NEAT || KOR || align=right | 2.5 km || 
|-id=031 bgcolor=#E9E9E9
| 161031 ||  || — || April 8, 2002 || Palomar || NEAT || MIS || align=right | 2.8 km || 
|-id=032 bgcolor=#d6d6d6
| 161032 ||  || — || April 8, 2002 || Palomar || NEAT || — || align=right | 4.1 km || 
|-id=033 bgcolor=#E9E9E9
| 161033 ||  || — || April 10, 2002 || Socorro || LINEAR || — || align=right | 2.2 km || 
|-id=034 bgcolor=#E9E9E9
| 161034 ||  || — || April 9, 2002 || Socorro || LINEAR || — || align=right | 2.8 km || 
|-id=035 bgcolor=#d6d6d6
| 161035 ||  || — || April 9, 2002 || Socorro || LINEAR || — || align=right | 5.8 km || 
|-id=036 bgcolor=#E9E9E9
| 161036 ||  || — || April 10, 2002 || Socorro || LINEAR || — || align=right | 1.8 km || 
|-id=037 bgcolor=#E9E9E9
| 161037 ||  || — || April 10, 2002 || Socorro || LINEAR || — || align=right | 2.8 km || 
|-id=038 bgcolor=#FA8072
| 161038 ||  || — || April 11, 2002 || Anderson Mesa || LONEOS || H || align=right | 1.0 km || 
|-id=039 bgcolor=#E9E9E9
| 161039 ||  || — || April 12, 2002 || Palomar || NEAT || JUN || align=right | 1.7 km || 
|-id=040 bgcolor=#d6d6d6
| 161040 ||  || — || April 13, 2002 || Palomar || NEAT || EMA || align=right | 5.5 km || 
|-id=041 bgcolor=#E9E9E9
| 161041 ||  || — || April 14, 2002 || Socorro || LINEAR || — || align=right | 2.9 km || 
|-id=042 bgcolor=#E9E9E9
| 161042 ||  || — || April 14, 2002 || Palomar || NEAT || — || align=right | 2.6 km || 
|-id=043 bgcolor=#E9E9E9
| 161043 ||  || — || April 9, 2002 || Socorro || LINEAR || — || align=right | 2.5 km || 
|-id=044 bgcolor=#C2FFFF
| 161044 ||  || — || April 8, 2002 || Palomar || NEAT || L4 || align=right | 14 km || 
|-id=045 bgcolor=#E9E9E9
| 161045 ||  || — || April 14, 2002 || Socorro || LINEAR || — || align=right | 2.2 km || 
|-id=046 bgcolor=#E9E9E9
| 161046 ||  || — || April 16, 2002 || Socorro || LINEAR || — || align=right | 2.3 km || 
|-id=047 bgcolor=#E9E9E9
| 161047 ||  || — || May 3, 2002 || Kitt Peak || Spacewatch || — || align=right | 5.2 km || 
|-id=048 bgcolor=#E9E9E9
| 161048 ||  || — || May 5, 2002 || Palomar || NEAT || — || align=right | 2.5 km || 
|-id=049 bgcolor=#E9E9E9
| 161049 ||  || — || May 8, 2002 || Desert Eagle || W. K. Y. Yeung || EUN || align=right | 2.0 km || 
|-id=050 bgcolor=#E9E9E9
| 161050 ||  || — || May 8, 2002 || Socorro || LINEAR || — || align=right | 4.8 km || 
|-id=051 bgcolor=#E9E9E9
| 161051 ||  || — || May 8, 2002 || Socorro || LINEAR || EUN || align=right | 2.0 km || 
|-id=052 bgcolor=#E9E9E9
| 161052 ||  || — || May 9, 2002 || Socorro || LINEAR || — || align=right | 2.0 km || 
|-id=053 bgcolor=#E9E9E9
| 161053 ||  || — || May 9, 2002 || Socorro || LINEAR || — || align=right | 2.8 km || 
|-id=054 bgcolor=#E9E9E9
| 161054 ||  || — || May 9, 2002 || Socorro || LINEAR || — || align=right | 2.9 km || 
|-id=055 bgcolor=#E9E9E9
| 161055 ||  || — || May 9, 2002 || Socorro || LINEAR || — || align=right | 3.1 km || 
|-id=056 bgcolor=#d6d6d6
| 161056 ||  || — || May 9, 2002 || Socorro || LINEAR || — || align=right | 3.4 km || 
|-id=057 bgcolor=#E9E9E9
| 161057 ||  || — || May 9, 2002 || Socorro || LINEAR || RAF || align=right | 2.7 km || 
|-id=058 bgcolor=#E9E9E9
| 161058 ||  || — || May 11, 2002 || Socorro || LINEAR || MIS || align=right | 3.5 km || 
|-id=059 bgcolor=#E9E9E9
| 161059 ||  || — || May 11, 2002 || Socorro || LINEAR || — || align=right | 1.7 km || 
|-id=060 bgcolor=#E9E9E9
| 161060 ||  || — || May 11, 2002 || Socorro || LINEAR || — || align=right | 2.7 km || 
|-id=061 bgcolor=#E9E9E9
| 161061 ||  || — || May 13, 2002 || Palomar || NEAT || EUN || align=right | 2.2 km || 
|-id=062 bgcolor=#E9E9E9
| 161062 ||  || — || May 9, 2002 || Socorro || LINEAR || — || align=right | 4.0 km || 
|-id=063 bgcolor=#E9E9E9
| 161063 ||  || — || May 15, 2002 || Socorro || LINEAR || — || align=right | 2.9 km || 
|-id=064 bgcolor=#E9E9E9
| 161064 ||  || — || May 11, 2002 || Palomar || NEAT || EUN || align=right | 2.2 km || 
|-id=065 bgcolor=#E9E9E9
| 161065 ||  || — || May 13, 2002 || Palomar || NEAT || EUN || align=right | 2.0 km || 
|-id=066 bgcolor=#E9E9E9
| 161066 ||  || — || May 16, 2002 || Socorro || LINEAR || — || align=right | 2.6 km || 
|-id=067 bgcolor=#E9E9E9
| 161067 ||  || — || May 29, 2002 || Haleakala || NEAT || EUN || align=right | 2.8 km || 
|-id=068 bgcolor=#E9E9E9
| 161068 ||  || — || May 17, 2002 || Palomar || NEAT || — || align=right | 2.3 km || 
|-id=069 bgcolor=#E9E9E9
| 161069 ||  || — || June 5, 2002 || Socorro || LINEAR || — || align=right | 3.1 km || 
|-id=070 bgcolor=#fefefe
| 161070 ||  || — || June 6, 2002 || Socorro || LINEAR || FLO || align=right | 1.0 km || 
|-id=071 bgcolor=#fefefe
| 161071 ||  || — || June 2, 2002 || Palomar || NEAT || — || align=right | 2.5 km || 
|-id=072 bgcolor=#E9E9E9
| 161072 ||  || — || June 9, 2002 || Socorro || LINEAR || KRM || align=right | 3.9 km || 
|-id=073 bgcolor=#d6d6d6
| 161073 ||  || — || June 12, 2002 || Fountain Hills || C. W. Juels, P. R. Holvorcem || — || align=right | 4.2 km || 
|-id=074 bgcolor=#E9E9E9
| 161074 ||  || — || June 12, 2002 || Socorro || LINEAR || — || align=right | 4.9 km || 
|-id=075 bgcolor=#E9E9E9
| 161075 ||  || — || June 6, 2002 || Kitt Peak || Spacewatch || INO || align=right | 1.7 km || 
|-id=076 bgcolor=#E9E9E9
| 161076 ||  || — || June 10, 2002 || Socorro || LINEAR || — || align=right | 4.2 km || 
|-id=077 bgcolor=#d6d6d6
| 161077 ||  || — || June 10, 2002 || Socorro || LINEAR || — || align=right | 4.7 km || 
|-id=078 bgcolor=#d6d6d6
| 161078 ||  || — || June 10, 2002 || Palomar || NEAT || — || align=right | 8.2 km || 
|-id=079 bgcolor=#d6d6d6
| 161079 ||  || — || June 14, 2002 || Palomar || NEAT || LIX || align=right | 5.5 km || 
|-id=080 bgcolor=#d6d6d6
| 161080 ||  || — || June 19, 2002 || Campo Imperatore || CINEOS || — || align=right | 11 km || 
|-id=081 bgcolor=#FA8072
| 161081 ||  || — || July 5, 2002 || Socorro || LINEAR || — || align=right | 1.8 km || 
|-id=082 bgcolor=#E9E9E9
| 161082 ||  || — || July 1, 2002 || Palomar || NEAT || — || align=right | 4.4 km || 
|-id=083 bgcolor=#d6d6d6
| 161083 ||  || — || July 9, 2002 || Socorro || LINEAR || BRA || align=right | 2.3 km || 
|-id=084 bgcolor=#fefefe
| 161084 ||  || — || July 2, 2002 || Palomar || NEAT || NYS || align=right data-sort-value="0.79" | 790 m || 
|-id=085 bgcolor=#d6d6d6
| 161085 ||  || — || July 17, 2002 || Socorro || LINEAR || — || align=right | 8.2 km || 
|-id=086 bgcolor=#d6d6d6
| 161086 ||  || — || July 17, 2002 || Socorro || LINEAR || — || align=right | 8.4 km || 
|-id=087 bgcolor=#d6d6d6
| 161087 ||  || — || July 19, 2002 || Palomar || NEAT || — || align=right | 3.9 km || 
|-id=088 bgcolor=#d6d6d6
| 161088 ||  || — || July 21, 2002 || Palomar || NEAT || — || align=right | 4.1 km || 
|-id=089 bgcolor=#E9E9E9
| 161089 ||  || — || July 22, 2002 || Palomar || NEAT || — || align=right | 1.5 km || 
|-id=090 bgcolor=#d6d6d6
| 161090 ||  || — || July 18, 2002 || Socorro || LINEAR || — || align=right | 5.3 km || 
|-id=091 bgcolor=#E9E9E9
| 161091 ||  || — || July 18, 2002 || Socorro || LINEAR || — || align=right | 1.6 km || 
|-id=092 bgcolor=#d6d6d6
| 161092 Zsigmond ||  ||  || July 29, 2002 || Palomar || K. Sárneczky || — || align=right | 3.7 km || 
|-id=093 bgcolor=#fefefe
| 161093 ||  || — || August 5, 2002 || Socorro || LINEAR || NYS || align=right | 1.3 km || 
|-id=094 bgcolor=#d6d6d6
| 161094 ||  || — || August 9, 2002 || Socorro || LINEAR || EUP || align=right | 7.5 km || 
|-id=095 bgcolor=#d6d6d6
| 161095 ||  || — || August 9, 2002 || Socorro || LINEAR || — || align=right | 6.7 km || 
|-id=096 bgcolor=#d6d6d6
| 161096 ||  || — || August 14, 2002 || Socorro || LINEAR || EMA || align=right | 7.1 km || 
|-id=097 bgcolor=#E9E9E9
| 161097 ||  || — || August 14, 2002 || Socorro || LINEAR || — || align=right | 5.0 km || 
|-id=098 bgcolor=#fefefe
| 161098 ||  || — || August 13, 2002 || Anderson Mesa || LONEOS || V || align=right | 1.1 km || 
|-id=099 bgcolor=#fefefe
| 161099 ||  || — || August 13, 2002 || Anderson Mesa || LONEOS || FLO || align=right | 1.1 km || 
|-id=100 bgcolor=#fefefe
| 161100 ||  || — || August 13, 2002 || Anderson Mesa || LONEOS || — || align=right | 1.2 km || 
|}

161101–161200 

|-bgcolor=#d6d6d6
| 161101 ||  || — || August 9, 2002 || Socorro || LINEAR || slow || align=right | 4.5 km || 
|-id=102 bgcolor=#d6d6d6
| 161102 ||  || — || August 8, 2002 || Palomar || A. Lowe || — || align=right | 3.4 km || 
|-id=103 bgcolor=#fefefe
| 161103 ||  || — || August 8, 2002 || Palomar || NEAT || — || align=right data-sort-value="0.83" | 830 m || 
|-id=104 bgcolor=#d6d6d6
| 161104 ||  || — || August 8, 2002 || Palomar || NEAT || — || align=right | 5.7 km || 
|-id=105 bgcolor=#d6d6d6
| 161105 ||  || — || August 16, 2002 || Palomar || NEAT || EOS || align=right | 3.9 km || 
|-id=106 bgcolor=#d6d6d6
| 161106 ||  || — || August 26, 2002 || Palomar || NEAT || — || align=right | 5.1 km || 
|-id=107 bgcolor=#d6d6d6
| 161107 ||  || — || August 27, 2002 || Palomar || NEAT || — || align=right | 4.8 km || 
|-id=108 bgcolor=#d6d6d6
| 161108 ||  || — || August 28, 2002 || Palomar || NEAT || — || align=right | 3.5 km || 
|-id=109 bgcolor=#E9E9E9
| 161109 ||  || — || August 29, 2002 || Palomar || NEAT || — || align=right | 4.6 km || 
|-id=110 bgcolor=#d6d6d6
| 161110 ||  || — || August 29, 2002 || Palomar || S. F. Hönig || — || align=right | 4.0 km || 
|-id=111 bgcolor=#d6d6d6
| 161111 ||  || — || August 29, 2002 || Palomar || S. F. Hönig || KOR || align=right | 2.4 km || 
|-id=112 bgcolor=#d6d6d6
| 161112 ||  || — || August 29, 2002 || Palomar || S. F. Hönig || — || align=right | 4.3 km || 
|-id=113 bgcolor=#d6d6d6
| 161113 ||  || — || August 26, 2002 || Palomar || NEAT || — || align=right | 4.9 km || 
|-id=114 bgcolor=#fefefe
| 161114 ||  || — || September 4, 2002 || Anderson Mesa || LONEOS || — || align=right | 1.5 km || 
|-id=115 bgcolor=#d6d6d6
| 161115 ||  || — || September 4, 2002 || Anderson Mesa || LONEOS || — || align=right | 5.8 km || 
|-id=116 bgcolor=#d6d6d6
| 161116 ||  || — || September 3, 2002 || Palomar || NEAT || EUP || align=right | 7.9 km || 
|-id=117 bgcolor=#d6d6d6
| 161117 ||  || — || September 4, 2002 || Anderson Mesa || LONEOS || THM || align=right | 5.0 km || 
|-id=118 bgcolor=#d6d6d6
| 161118 ||  || — || September 4, 2002 || Anderson Mesa || LONEOS || — || align=right | 5.5 km || 
|-id=119 bgcolor=#d6d6d6
| 161119 ||  || — || September 4, 2002 || Anderson Mesa || LONEOS || — || align=right | 6.8 km || 
|-id=120 bgcolor=#d6d6d6
| 161120 ||  || — || September 4, 2002 || Anderson Mesa || LONEOS || — || align=right | 7.6 km || 
|-id=121 bgcolor=#fefefe
| 161121 ||  || — || September 4, 2002 || Anderson Mesa || LONEOS || — || align=right | 1.8 km || 
|-id=122 bgcolor=#d6d6d6
| 161122 ||  || — || September 4, 2002 || Anderson Mesa || LONEOS || — || align=right | 7.1 km || 
|-id=123 bgcolor=#d6d6d6
| 161123 ||  || — || September 5, 2002 || Anderson Mesa || LONEOS || — || align=right | 4.8 km || 
|-id=124 bgcolor=#d6d6d6
| 161124 ||  || — || September 5, 2002 || Socorro || LINEAR || — || align=right | 5.4 km || 
|-id=125 bgcolor=#d6d6d6
| 161125 ||  || — || September 5, 2002 || Anderson Mesa || LONEOS || — || align=right | 7.1 km || 
|-id=126 bgcolor=#d6d6d6
| 161126 ||  || — || September 5, 2002 || Socorro || LINEAR || — || align=right | 8.2 km || 
|-id=127 bgcolor=#d6d6d6
| 161127 ||  || — || September 4, 2002 || Anderson Mesa || LONEOS || EOS || align=right | 3.3 km || 
|-id=128 bgcolor=#d6d6d6
| 161128 ||  || — || September 5, 2002 || Socorro || LINEAR || — || align=right | 4.8 km || 
|-id=129 bgcolor=#d6d6d6
| 161129 ||  || — || September 5, 2002 || Socorro || LINEAR || KOR || align=right | 2.9 km || 
|-id=130 bgcolor=#d6d6d6
| 161130 ||  || — || September 5, 2002 || Socorro || LINEAR || — || align=right | 7.5 km || 
|-id=131 bgcolor=#fefefe
| 161131 ||  || — || September 5, 2002 || Socorro || LINEAR || — || align=right | 1.6 km || 
|-id=132 bgcolor=#d6d6d6
| 161132 ||  || — || September 5, 2002 || Socorro || LINEAR || — || align=right | 4.8 km || 
|-id=133 bgcolor=#d6d6d6
| 161133 ||  || — || September 5, 2002 || Haleakala || NEAT || — || align=right | 5.2 km || 
|-id=134 bgcolor=#d6d6d6
| 161134 ||  || — || September 6, 2002 || Socorro || LINEAR || — || align=right | 5.7 km || 
|-id=135 bgcolor=#fefefe
| 161135 ||  || — || September 6, 2002 || Socorro || LINEAR || NYS || align=right | 1.2 km || 
|-id=136 bgcolor=#d6d6d6
| 161136 ||  || — || September 1, 2002 || Kvistaberg || UDAS || — || align=right | 4.5 km || 
|-id=137 bgcolor=#d6d6d6
| 161137 ||  || — || September 11, 2002 || Haleakala || NEAT || EOS || align=right | 3.6 km || 
|-id=138 bgcolor=#d6d6d6
| 161138 ||  || — || September 13, 2002 || Socorro || LINEAR || — || align=right | 6.6 km || 
|-id=139 bgcolor=#d6d6d6
| 161139 ||  || — || September 11, 2002 || Haleakala || NEAT || — || align=right | 5.5 km || 
|-id=140 bgcolor=#d6d6d6
| 161140 ||  || — || September 12, 2002 || Palomar || NEAT || — || align=right | 5.8 km || 
|-id=141 bgcolor=#d6d6d6
| 161141 ||  || — || September 12, 2002 || Palomar || NEAT || — || align=right | 4.0 km || 
|-id=142 bgcolor=#d6d6d6
| 161142 ||  || — || September 12, 2002 || Palomar || NEAT || — || align=right | 5.5 km || 
|-id=143 bgcolor=#d6d6d6
| 161143 ||  || — || September 12, 2002 || Palomar || NEAT || — || align=right | 4.2 km || 
|-id=144 bgcolor=#d6d6d6
| 161144 ||  || — || September 13, 2002 || Palomar || NEAT || — || align=right | 4.7 km || 
|-id=145 bgcolor=#d6d6d6
| 161145 ||  || — || September 14, 2002 || Palomar || NEAT || EOS || align=right | 2.9 km || 
|-id=146 bgcolor=#d6d6d6
| 161146 ||  || — || September 15, 2002 || Palomar || NEAT || KOR || align=right | 2.4 km || 
|-id=147 bgcolor=#d6d6d6
| 161147 ||  || — || September 14, 2002 || Palomar || NEAT || — || align=right | 3.6 km || 
|-id=148 bgcolor=#d6d6d6
| 161148 ||  || — || September 27, 2002 || Palomar || NEAT || URS || align=right | 7.8 km || 
|-id=149 bgcolor=#fefefe
| 161149 ||  || — || September 26, 2002 || Palomar || NEAT || NYS || align=right | 2.4 km || 
|-id=150 bgcolor=#fefefe
| 161150 ||  || — || September 28, 2002 || Haleakala || NEAT || — || align=right data-sort-value="0.87" | 870 m || 
|-id=151 bgcolor=#d6d6d6
| 161151 ||  || — || September 29, 2002 || Haleakala || NEAT || VER || align=right | 6.5 km || 
|-id=152 bgcolor=#fefefe
| 161152 ||  || — || September 27, 2002 || Socorro || LINEAR || H || align=right | 1.8 km || 
|-id=153 bgcolor=#d6d6d6
| 161153 ||  || — || September 28, 2002 || Haleakala || NEAT || — || align=right | 5.5 km || 
|-id=154 bgcolor=#d6d6d6
| 161154 ||  || — || September 29, 2002 || Kitt Peak || Spacewatch || — || align=right | 4.3 km || 
|-id=155 bgcolor=#fefefe
| 161155 ||  || — || September 29, 2002 || Haleakala || NEAT || NYS || align=right | 1.1 km || 
|-id=156 bgcolor=#d6d6d6
| 161156 ||  || — || September 30, 2002 || Drebach || Drebach Obs. || — || align=right | 4.8 km || 
|-id=157 bgcolor=#d6d6d6
| 161157 ||  || — || September 30, 2002 || Socorro || LINEAR || — || align=right | 4.9 km || 
|-id=158 bgcolor=#d6d6d6
| 161158 ||  || — || September 18, 2002 || Palomar || NEAT || — || align=right | 7.7 km || 
|-id=159 bgcolor=#fefefe
| 161159 ||  || — || September 30, 2002 || Haleakala || NEAT || FLO || align=right | 2.3 km || 
|-id=160 bgcolor=#d6d6d6
| 161160 ||  || — || September 30, 2002 || Haleakala || NEAT || — || align=right | 5.3 km || 
|-id=161 bgcolor=#d6d6d6
| 161161 || 2002 TX || — || October 1, 2002 || Anderson Mesa || LONEOS || — || align=right | 5.1 km || 
|-id=162 bgcolor=#d6d6d6
| 161162 ||  || — || October 1, 2002 || Anderson Mesa || LONEOS || HYG || align=right | 4.9 km || 
|-id=163 bgcolor=#E9E9E9
| 161163 ||  || — || October 1, 2002 || Anderson Mesa || LONEOS || — || align=right | 2.1 km || 
|-id=164 bgcolor=#d6d6d6
| 161164 ||  || — || October 1, 2002 || Anderson Mesa || LONEOS || THM || align=right | 3.8 km || 
|-id=165 bgcolor=#d6d6d6
| 161165 ||  || — || October 2, 2002 || Socorro || LINEAR || EOS || align=right | 4.2 km || 
|-id=166 bgcolor=#d6d6d6
| 161166 ||  || — || October 2, 2002 || Socorro || LINEAR || — || align=right | 4.4 km || 
|-id=167 bgcolor=#d6d6d6
| 161167 ||  || — || October 2, 2002 || Socorro || LINEAR || — || align=right | 4.7 km || 
|-id=168 bgcolor=#fefefe
| 161168 ||  || — || October 2, 2002 || Socorro || LINEAR || — || align=right | 1.2 km || 
|-id=169 bgcolor=#d6d6d6
| 161169 ||  || — || October 2, 2002 || Socorro || LINEAR || TIR || align=right | 5.8 km || 
|-id=170 bgcolor=#E9E9E9
| 161170 ||  || — || October 2, 2002 || Socorro || LINEAR || — || align=right | 1.7 km || 
|-id=171 bgcolor=#d6d6d6
| 161171 ||  || — || October 2, 2002 || Socorro || LINEAR || — || align=right | 7.7 km || 
|-id=172 bgcolor=#d6d6d6
| 161172 ||  || — || October 2, 2002 || Haleakala || NEAT || TIR || align=right | 5.9 km || 
|-id=173 bgcolor=#d6d6d6
| 161173 ||  || — || October 3, 2002 || Campo Imperatore || CINEOS || HYG || align=right | 6.6 km || 
|-id=174 bgcolor=#fefefe
| 161174 ||  || — || October 7, 2002 || Socorro || LINEAR || H || align=right | 1.1 km || 
|-id=175 bgcolor=#d6d6d6
| 161175 ||  || — || October 3, 2002 || Palomar || NEAT || EOS || align=right | 4.0 km || 
|-id=176 bgcolor=#d6d6d6
| 161176 ||  || — || October 1, 2002 || Anderson Mesa || LONEOS || — || align=right | 5.1 km || 
|-id=177 bgcolor=#d6d6d6
| 161177 ||  || — || October 3, 2002 || Palomar || NEAT || — || align=right | 6.5 km || 
|-id=178 bgcolor=#d6d6d6
| 161178 ||  || — || October 4, 2002 || Palomar || NEAT || — || align=right | 5.3 km || 
|-id=179 bgcolor=#d6d6d6
| 161179 ||  || — || October 4, 2002 || Socorro || LINEAR || — || align=right | 6.0 km || 
|-id=180 bgcolor=#d6d6d6
| 161180 ||  || — || October 4, 2002 || Anderson Mesa || LONEOS || — || align=right | 3.9 km || 
|-id=181 bgcolor=#d6d6d6
| 161181 ||  || — || October 2, 2002 || Haleakala || NEAT || EUP || align=right | 6.9 km || 
|-id=182 bgcolor=#d6d6d6
| 161182 ||  || — || October 3, 2002 || Palomar || NEAT || — || align=right | 5.3 km || 
|-id=183 bgcolor=#d6d6d6
| 161183 ||  || — || October 4, 2002 || Palomar || NEAT || — || align=right | 6.5 km || 
|-id=184 bgcolor=#d6d6d6
| 161184 ||  || — || October 4, 2002 || Socorro || LINEAR || — || align=right | 5.8 km || 
|-id=185 bgcolor=#d6d6d6
| 161185 ||  || — || October 4, 2002 || Palomar || NEAT || EOS || align=right | 3.9 km || 
|-id=186 bgcolor=#d6d6d6
| 161186 ||  || — || October 4, 2002 || Anderson Mesa || LONEOS || — || align=right | 6.5 km || 
|-id=187 bgcolor=#d6d6d6
| 161187 ||  || — || October 4, 2002 || Anderson Mesa || LONEOS || — || align=right | 5.6 km || 
|-id=188 bgcolor=#d6d6d6
| 161188 ||  || — || October 5, 2002 || Palomar || NEAT || ALA || align=right | 7.7 km || 
|-id=189 bgcolor=#E9E9E9
| 161189 ||  || — || October 13, 2002 || Palomar || NEAT || MAR || align=right | 1.9 km || 
|-id=190 bgcolor=#d6d6d6
| 161190 ||  || — || October 14, 2002 || Socorro || LINEAR || MEL || align=right | 6.8 km || 
|-id=191 bgcolor=#d6d6d6
| 161191 ||  || — || October 4, 2002 || Socorro || LINEAR || EOS || align=right | 3.4 km || 
|-id=192 bgcolor=#fefefe
| 161192 ||  || — || October 4, 2002 || Campo Imperatore || CINEOS || NYS || align=right data-sort-value="0.92" | 920 m || 
|-id=193 bgcolor=#E9E9E9
| 161193 ||  || — || October 6, 2002 || Socorro || LINEAR || — || align=right | 3.1 km || 
|-id=194 bgcolor=#E9E9E9
| 161194 ||  || — || October 4, 2002 || Socorro || LINEAR || — || align=right | 2.7 km || 
|-id=195 bgcolor=#d6d6d6
| 161195 ||  || — || October 8, 2002 || Anderson Mesa || LONEOS || HYG || align=right | 5.0 km || 
|-id=196 bgcolor=#d6d6d6
| 161196 ||  || — || October 9, 2002 || Socorro || LINEAR || — || align=right | 4.9 km || 
|-id=197 bgcolor=#d6d6d6
| 161197 ||  || — || October 8, 2002 || Palomar || NEAT || EUP || align=right | 7.5 km || 
|-id=198 bgcolor=#E9E9E9
| 161198 ||  || — || October 6, 2002 || Socorro || LINEAR || ADE || align=right | 4.5 km || 
|-id=199 bgcolor=#d6d6d6
| 161199 ||  || — || October 7, 2002 || Haleakala || NEAT || — || align=right | 4.9 km || 
|-id=200 bgcolor=#E9E9E9
| 161200 ||  || — || October 9, 2002 || Anderson Mesa || LONEOS || — || align=right | 4.9 km || 
|}

161201–161300 

|-bgcolor=#d6d6d6
| 161201 ||  || — || October 9, 2002 || Anderson Mesa || LONEOS || — || align=right | 7.7 km || 
|-id=202 bgcolor=#fefefe
| 161202 ||  || — || October 9, 2002 || Socorro || LINEAR || MAS || align=right | 1.1 km || 
|-id=203 bgcolor=#d6d6d6
| 161203 ||  || — || October 9, 2002 || Socorro || LINEAR || — || align=right | 5.5 km || 
|-id=204 bgcolor=#d6d6d6
| 161204 ||  || — || October 9, 2002 || Socorro || LINEAR || — || align=right | 5.8 km || 
|-id=205 bgcolor=#d6d6d6
| 161205 ||  || — || October 9, 2002 || Socorro || LINEAR || — || align=right | 5.5 km || 
|-id=206 bgcolor=#fefefe
| 161206 ||  || — || October 10, 2002 || Socorro || LINEAR || — || align=right | 1.5 km || 
|-id=207 bgcolor=#d6d6d6
| 161207 Lidz ||  ||  || October 4, 2002 || Apache Point || SDSS || HYG || align=right | 4.7 km || 
|-id=208 bgcolor=#d6d6d6
| 161208 ||  || — || October 28, 2002 || Palomar || NEAT || HYG || align=right | 5.4 km || 
|-id=209 bgcolor=#d6d6d6
| 161209 ||  || — || October 28, 2002 || Socorro || LINEAR || — || align=right | 6.4 km || 
|-id=210 bgcolor=#fefefe
| 161210 ||  || — || October 28, 2002 || Palomar || NEAT || V || align=right | 1.4 km || 
|-id=211 bgcolor=#d6d6d6
| 161211 ||  || — || October 28, 2002 || Palomar || NEAT || — || align=right | 7.1 km || 
|-id=212 bgcolor=#E9E9E9
| 161212 ||  || — || October 30, 2002 || Haleakala || NEAT || — || align=right | 3.9 km || 
|-id=213 bgcolor=#d6d6d6
| 161213 ||  || — || October 30, 2002 || Haleakala || NEAT || VER || align=right | 5.1 km || 
|-id=214 bgcolor=#d6d6d6
| 161214 ||  || — || October 31, 2002 || Anderson Mesa || LONEOS || THM || align=right | 4.7 km || 
|-id=215 bgcolor=#E9E9E9
| 161215 Loveday ||  ||  || October 30, 2002 || Apache Point || SDSS || — || align=right | 2.7 km || 
|-id=216 bgcolor=#d6d6d6
| 161216 ||  || — || November 1, 2002 || Palomar || NEAT || HYG || align=right | 5.3 km || 
|-id=217 bgcolor=#d6d6d6
| 161217 ||  || — || November 6, 2002 || Socorro || LINEAR || THM || align=right | 4.5 km || 
|-id=218 bgcolor=#d6d6d6
| 161218 ||  || — || November 10, 2002 || Socorro || LINEAR || — || align=right | 7.8 km || 
|-id=219 bgcolor=#fefefe
| 161219 ||  || — || November 14, 2002 || Palomar || NEAT || — || align=right | 1.2 km || 
|-id=220 bgcolor=#d6d6d6
| 161220 ||  || — || November 29, 2002 || Eskridge || Farpoint Obs. || — || align=right | 5.0 km || 
|-id=221 bgcolor=#d6d6d6
| 161221 ||  || — || December 1, 2002 || Socorro || LINEAR || slow || align=right | 5.7 km || 
|-id=222 bgcolor=#d6d6d6
| 161222 ||  || — || December 1, 2002 || Socorro || LINEAR || — || align=right | 4.5 km || 
|-id=223 bgcolor=#fefefe
| 161223 ||  || — || December 2, 2002 || Socorro || LINEAR || FLO || align=right | 1.6 km || 
|-id=224 bgcolor=#d6d6d6
| 161224 ||  || — || December 7, 2002 || Socorro || LINEAR || — || align=right | 5.6 km || 
|-id=225 bgcolor=#d6d6d6
| 161225 ||  || — || December 10, 2002 || Socorro || LINEAR || — || align=right | 9.4 km || 
|-id=226 bgcolor=#E9E9E9
| 161226 ||  || — || December 11, 2002 || Socorro || LINEAR || — || align=right | 2.0 km || 
|-id=227 bgcolor=#d6d6d6
| 161227 ||  || — || December 12, 2002 || Haleakala || NEAT || — || align=right | 6.0 km || 
|-id=228 bgcolor=#d6d6d6
| 161228 ||  || — || December 10, 2002 || Palomar || NEAT || — || align=right | 5.7 km || 
|-id=229 bgcolor=#fefefe
| 161229 ||  || — || December 10, 2002 || Socorro || LINEAR || V || align=right | 1.2 km || 
|-id=230 bgcolor=#fefefe
| 161230 Martinbacháček ||  ||  || December 13, 2002 || Kleť || KLENOT || NYS || align=right | 1.4 km || 
|-id=231 bgcolor=#fefefe
| 161231 ||  || — || December 6, 2002 || Socorro || LINEAR || — || align=right | 2.9 km || 
|-id=232 bgcolor=#fefefe
| 161232 ||  || — || December 31, 2002 || Socorro || LINEAR || — || align=right | 1.1 km || 
|-id=233 bgcolor=#fefefe
| 161233 ||  || — || January 2, 2003 || Socorro || LINEAR || H || align=right | 1.3 km || 
|-id=234 bgcolor=#fefefe
| 161234 ||  || — || January 3, 2003 || Socorro || LINEAR || H || align=right | 1.0 km || 
|-id=235 bgcolor=#E9E9E9
| 161235 ||  || — || January 2, 2003 || Socorro || LINEAR || — || align=right | 4.1 km || 
|-id=236 bgcolor=#fefefe
| 161236 ||  || — || January 4, 2003 || Socorro || LINEAR || — || align=right | 1.5 km || 
|-id=237 bgcolor=#fefefe
| 161237 ||  || — || January 7, 2003 || Socorro || LINEAR || — || align=right | 1.00 km || 
|-id=238 bgcolor=#d6d6d6
| 161238 ||  || — || January 7, 2003 || Socorro || LINEAR || — || align=right | 5.4 km || 
|-id=239 bgcolor=#fefefe
| 161239 ||  || — || January 8, 2003 || Socorro || LINEAR || V || align=right | 1.2 km || 
|-id=240 bgcolor=#d6d6d6
| 161240 ||  || — || January 26, 2003 || Palomar || NEAT || EOS || align=right | 3.7 km || 
|-id=241 bgcolor=#fefefe
| 161241 ||  || — || January 26, 2003 || Anderson Mesa || LONEOS || NYS || align=right | 1.0 km || 
|-id=242 bgcolor=#fefefe
| 161242 ||  || — || January 26, 2003 || Palomar || NEAT || — || align=right | 2.5 km || 
|-id=243 bgcolor=#fefefe
| 161243 ||  || — || January 26, 2003 || Haleakala || NEAT || — || align=right | 1.5 km || 
|-id=244 bgcolor=#fefefe
| 161244 ||  || — || January 27, 2003 || Socorro || LINEAR || — || align=right | 1.7 km || 
|-id=245 bgcolor=#E9E9E9
| 161245 ||  || — || January 29, 2003 || Palomar || NEAT || — || align=right | 3.4 km || 
|-id=246 bgcolor=#d6d6d6
| 161246 ||  || — || January 31, 2003 || Socorro || LINEAR || — || align=right | 8.1 km || 
|-id=247 bgcolor=#fefefe
| 161247 ||  || — || January 30, 2003 || Anderson Mesa || LONEOS || NYS || align=right | 1.0 km || 
|-id=248 bgcolor=#E9E9E9
| 161248 ||  || — || February 6, 2003 || Kitt Peak || Spacewatch || — || align=right | 1.7 km || 
|-id=249 bgcolor=#fefefe
| 161249 ||  || — || February 22, 2003 || Palomar || NEAT || FLO || align=right data-sort-value="0.97" | 970 m || 
|-id=250 bgcolor=#fefefe
| 161250 ||  || — || March 6, 2003 || Anderson Mesa || LONEOS || — || align=right | 1.3 km || 
|-id=251 bgcolor=#fefefe
| 161251 ||  || — || March 6, 2003 || Socorro || LINEAR || NYS || align=right | 1.2 km || 
|-id=252 bgcolor=#E9E9E9
| 161252 ||  || — || March 6, 2003 || Socorro || LINEAR || — || align=right | 2.8 km || 
|-id=253 bgcolor=#E9E9E9
| 161253 ||  || — || March 8, 2003 || Anderson Mesa || LONEOS || — || align=right | 3.2 km || 
|-id=254 bgcolor=#d6d6d6
| 161254 ||  || — || March 9, 2003 || Kitt Peak || Spacewatch || VER || align=right | 3.6 km || 
|-id=255 bgcolor=#E9E9E9
| 161255 ||  || — || March 9, 2003 || Socorro || LINEAR || — || align=right | 1.8 km || 
|-id=256 bgcolor=#E9E9E9
| 161256 ||  || — || March 9, 2003 || Socorro || LINEAR || JUN || align=right | 1.8 km || 
|-id=257 bgcolor=#fefefe
| 161257 ||  || — || March 23, 2003 || Drebach || Drebach Obs. || — || align=right | 1.3 km || 
|-id=258 bgcolor=#E9E9E9
| 161258 ||  || — || March 26, 2003 || Campo Imperatore || CINEOS || — || align=right | 3.1 km || 
|-id=259 bgcolor=#fefefe
| 161259 ||  || — || March 26, 2003 || Kleť || M. Tichý, M. Kočer || — || align=right | 1.6 km || 
|-id=260 bgcolor=#d6d6d6
| 161260 ||  || — || March 23, 2003 || Kvistaberg || UDAS || — || align=right | 6.0 km || 
|-id=261 bgcolor=#d6d6d6
| 161261 ||  || — || March 24, 2003 || Kitt Peak || Spacewatch || — || align=right | 4.4 km || 
|-id=262 bgcolor=#fefefe
| 161262 ||  || — || March 24, 2003 || Haleakala || NEAT || — || align=right | 1.7 km || 
|-id=263 bgcolor=#fefefe
| 161263 ||  || — || March 23, 2003 || Kitt Peak || Spacewatch || — || align=right | 1.2 km || 
|-id=264 bgcolor=#fefefe
| 161264 ||  || — || March 23, 2003 || Kitt Peak || Spacewatch || — || align=right | 1.6 km || 
|-id=265 bgcolor=#fefefe
| 161265 ||  || — || March 24, 2003 || Kitt Peak || Spacewatch || — || align=right | 1.4 km || 
|-id=266 bgcolor=#fefefe
| 161266 ||  || — || March 24, 2003 || Haleakala || NEAT || FLO || align=right | 3.2 km || 
|-id=267 bgcolor=#fefefe
| 161267 ||  || — || March 25, 2003 || Haleakala || NEAT || — || align=right | 1.4 km || 
|-id=268 bgcolor=#E9E9E9
| 161268 ||  || — || March 26, 2003 || Palomar || NEAT || — || align=right | 1.5 km || 
|-id=269 bgcolor=#fefefe
| 161269 ||  || — || March 26, 2003 || Palomar || NEAT || — || align=right | 1.3 km || 
|-id=270 bgcolor=#fefefe
| 161270 ||  || — || March 26, 2003 || Palomar || NEAT || — || align=right | 1.5 km || 
|-id=271 bgcolor=#E9E9E9
| 161271 ||  || — || March 26, 2003 || Haleakala || NEAT || EUN || align=right | 1.9 km || 
|-id=272 bgcolor=#fefefe
| 161272 ||  || — || March 27, 2003 || Palomar || NEAT || — || align=right | 3.0 km || 
|-id=273 bgcolor=#fefefe
| 161273 ||  || — || March 27, 2003 || Palomar || NEAT || — || align=right | 1.3 km || 
|-id=274 bgcolor=#fefefe
| 161274 ||  || — || March 28, 2003 || Anderson Mesa || LONEOS || — || align=right | 1.5 km || 
|-id=275 bgcolor=#E9E9E9
| 161275 ||  || — || March 31, 2003 || Kitt Peak || Spacewatch || — || align=right | 1.8 km || 
|-id=276 bgcolor=#E9E9E9
| 161276 ||  || — || March 30, 2003 || Socorro || LINEAR || — || align=right | 2.9 km || 
|-id=277 bgcolor=#d6d6d6
| 161277 ||  || — || March 25, 2003 || Palomar || NEAT || — || align=right | 3.6 km || 
|-id=278 bgcolor=#E9E9E9
| 161278 Cesarmendoza ||  ||  || March 24, 2003 || Mérida || I. R. Ferrín, C. Leal || — || align=right | 4.0 km || 
|-id=279 bgcolor=#E9E9E9
| 161279 ||  || — || March 22, 2003 || Palomar || NEAT || — || align=right | 2.1 km || 
|-id=280 bgcolor=#E9E9E9
| 161280 ||  || — || April 1, 2003 || Socorro || LINEAR || ADE || align=right | 4.1 km || 
|-id=281 bgcolor=#d6d6d6
| 161281 ||  || — || April 1, 2003 || Socorro || LINEAR || EOS || align=right | 3.6 km || 
|-id=282 bgcolor=#d6d6d6
| 161282 ||  || — || April 4, 2003 || Kitt Peak || Spacewatch || VER || align=right | 3.7 km || 
|-id=283 bgcolor=#fefefe
| 161283 ||  || — || April 8, 2003 || Socorro || LINEAR || V || align=right | 1.2 km || 
|-id=284 bgcolor=#fefefe
| 161284 ||  || — || April 9, 2003 || Socorro || LINEAR || — || align=right | 1.5 km || 
|-id=285 bgcolor=#fefefe
| 161285 ||  || — || April 25, 2003 || Anderson Mesa || LONEOS || — || align=right | 1.1 km || 
|-id=286 bgcolor=#fefefe
| 161286 ||  || — || April 26, 2003 || Haleakala || NEAT || NYS || align=right data-sort-value="0.94" | 940 m || 
|-id=287 bgcolor=#fefefe
| 161287 ||  || — || April 24, 2003 || Anderson Mesa || LONEOS || — || align=right | 1.6 km || 
|-id=288 bgcolor=#fefefe
| 161288 ||  || — || April 24, 2003 || Kitt Peak || Spacewatch || — || align=right | 1.5 km || 
|-id=289 bgcolor=#fefefe
| 161289 ||  || — || April 25, 2003 || Kitt Peak || Spacewatch || — || align=right data-sort-value="0.88" | 880 m || 
|-id=290 bgcolor=#fefefe
| 161290 ||  || — || April 26, 2003 || Haleakala || NEAT || FLO || align=right | 1.5 km || 
|-id=291 bgcolor=#FA8072
| 161291 ||  || — || April 28, 2003 || Anderson Mesa || LONEOS || — || align=right | 1.7 km || 
|-id=292 bgcolor=#fefefe
| 161292 ||  || — || April 28, 2003 || Haleakala || NEAT || — || align=right | 1.4 km || 
|-id=293 bgcolor=#fefefe
| 161293 ||  || — || April 28, 2003 || Socorro || LINEAR || — || align=right | 1.2 km || 
|-id=294 bgcolor=#E9E9E9
| 161294 ||  || — || May 8, 2003 || Haleakala || NEAT || — || align=right | 3.9 km || 
|-id=295 bgcolor=#fefefe
| 161295 ||  || — || May 6, 2003 || Kitt Peak || Spacewatch || — || align=right | 1.6 km || 
|-id=296 bgcolor=#E9E9E9
| 161296 ||  || — || May 23, 2003 || Kitt Peak || Spacewatch || — || align=right | 3.3 km || 
|-id=297 bgcolor=#d6d6d6
| 161297 ||  || — || May 27, 2003 || Kitt Peak || Spacewatch || — || align=right | 4.3 km || 
|-id=298 bgcolor=#fefefe
| 161298 ||  || — || June 4, 2003 || Socorro || LINEAR || — || align=right | 3.8 km || 
|-id=299 bgcolor=#fefefe
| 161299 ||  || — || June 5, 2003 || Nogales || Tenagra II Obs. || NYS || align=right | 1.1 km || 
|-id=300 bgcolor=#fefefe
| 161300 ||  || — || June 6, 2003 || Kitt Peak || Spacewatch || — || align=right | 4.7 km || 
|}

161301–161400 

|-bgcolor=#fefefe
| 161301 ||  || — || June 22, 2003 || Socorro || LINEAR || PHO || align=right | 4.2 km || 
|-id=302 bgcolor=#fefefe
| 161302 ||  || — || July 3, 2003 || Reedy Creek || J. Broughton || NYS || align=right | 1.3 km || 
|-id=303 bgcolor=#fefefe
| 161303 ||  || — || July 6, 2003 || Reedy Creek || J. Broughton || — || align=right | 1.8 km || 
|-id=304 bgcolor=#d6d6d6
| 161304 ||  || — || July 3, 2003 || Anderson Mesa || LONEOS || — || align=right | 5.6 km || 
|-id=305 bgcolor=#E9E9E9
| 161305 ||  || — || July 21, 2003 || Haleakala || NEAT || — || align=right | 3.7 km || 
|-id=306 bgcolor=#fefefe
| 161306 ||  || — || July 22, 2003 || Haleakala || NEAT || V || align=right | 1.3 km || 
|-id=307 bgcolor=#fefefe
| 161307 ||  || — || July 22, 2003 || Haleakala || NEAT || NYS || align=right | 1.3 km || 
|-id=308 bgcolor=#fefefe
| 161308 ||  || — || July 31, 2003 || Reedy Creek || J. Broughton || V || align=right | 1.3 km || 
|-id=309 bgcolor=#E9E9E9
| 161309 ||  || — || July 29, 2003 || Socorro || LINEAR || — || align=right | 3.7 km || 
|-id=310 bgcolor=#E9E9E9
| 161310 ||  || — || July 24, 2003 || Palomar || NEAT || EUN || align=right | 2.0 km || 
|-id=311 bgcolor=#E9E9E9
| 161311 ||  || — || July 24, 2003 || Palomar || NEAT || — || align=right | 1.4 km || 
|-id=312 bgcolor=#E9E9E9
| 161312 ||  || — || July 30, 2003 || Socorro || LINEAR || — || align=right | 1.8 km || 
|-id=313 bgcolor=#E9E9E9
| 161313 ||  || — || August 4, 2003 || Socorro || LINEAR || — || align=right | 1.5 km || 
|-id=314 bgcolor=#E9E9E9
| 161314 ||  || — || August 17, 2003 || Haleakala || NEAT || — || align=right | 1.8 km || 
|-id=315 bgcolor=#E9E9E9
| 161315 de Shalit ||  ||  || August 19, 2003 || Wise || D. Polishook || — || align=right | 1.5 km || 
|-id=316 bgcolor=#E9E9E9
| 161316 ||  || — || August 18, 2003 || Campo Imperatore || CINEOS || — || align=right | 2.0 km || 
|-id=317 bgcolor=#E9E9E9
| 161317 ||  || — || August 20, 2003 || Palomar || NEAT || — || align=right | 3.4 km || 
|-id=318 bgcolor=#fefefe
| 161318 ||  || — || August 22, 2003 || Palomar || NEAT || — || align=right | 1.4 km || 
|-id=319 bgcolor=#fefefe
| 161319 ||  || — || August 21, 2003 || Črni Vrh || Črni Vrh || NYS || align=right | 1.6 km || 
|-id=320 bgcolor=#E9E9E9
| 161320 ||  || — || August 22, 2003 || Campo Imperatore || CINEOS || — || align=right | 3.7 km || 
|-id=321 bgcolor=#fefefe
| 161321 ||  || — || August 22, 2003 || Socorro || LINEAR || — || align=right | 2.1 km || 
|-id=322 bgcolor=#E9E9E9
| 161322 ||  || — || August 22, 2003 || Palomar || NEAT || — || align=right | 1.8 km || 
|-id=323 bgcolor=#E9E9E9
| 161323 ||  || — || August 22, 2003 || Palomar || NEAT || — || align=right | 2.2 km || 
|-id=324 bgcolor=#E9E9E9
| 161324 ||  || — || August 22, 2003 || Socorro || LINEAR || — || align=right | 1.6 km || 
|-id=325 bgcolor=#E9E9E9
| 161325 ||  || — || August 22, 2003 || Palomar || NEAT || — || align=right | 1.5 km || 
|-id=326 bgcolor=#E9E9E9
| 161326 ||  || — || August 23, 2003 || Socorro || LINEAR || — || align=right | 2.6 km || 
|-id=327 bgcolor=#E9E9E9
| 161327 ||  || — || August 23, 2003 || Socorro || LINEAR || — || align=right | 3.4 km || 
|-id=328 bgcolor=#E9E9E9
| 161328 ||  || — || August 22, 2003 || Socorro || LINEAR || — || align=right | 3.3 km || 
|-id=329 bgcolor=#E9E9E9
| 161329 ||  || — || August 23, 2003 || Socorro || LINEAR || JUN || align=right | 1.4 km || 
|-id=330 bgcolor=#E9E9E9
| 161330 ||  || — || August 26, 2003 || Reedy Creek || J. Broughton || — || align=right | 1.8 km || 
|-id=331 bgcolor=#E9E9E9
| 161331 ||  || — || August 25, 2003 || Socorro || LINEAR || — || align=right | 3.2 km || 
|-id=332 bgcolor=#E9E9E9
| 161332 ||  || — || August 28, 2003 || Haleakala || NEAT || — || align=right | 2.2 km || 
|-id=333 bgcolor=#E9E9E9
| 161333 ||  || — || August 28, 2003 || Socorro || LINEAR || — || align=right | 2.0 km || 
|-id=334 bgcolor=#d6d6d6
| 161334 ||  || — || August 31, 2003 || Haleakala || NEAT || 3:2 || align=right | 9.2 km || 
|-id=335 bgcolor=#E9E9E9
| 161335 ||  || — || August 24, 2003 || Socorro || LINEAR || — || align=right | 1.6 km || 
|-id=336 bgcolor=#d6d6d6
| 161336 ||  || — || September 2, 2003 || Reedy Creek || J. Broughton || — || align=right | 7.3 km || 
|-id=337 bgcolor=#E9E9E9
| 161337 ||  || — || September 14, 2003 || Haleakala || NEAT || — || align=right | 3.8 km || 
|-id=338 bgcolor=#E9E9E9
| 161338 ||  || — || September 16, 2003 || Kitt Peak || Spacewatch || — || align=right | 5.5 km || 
|-id=339 bgcolor=#E9E9E9
| 161339 ||  || — || September 16, 2003 || Kitt Peak || Spacewatch || NEM || align=right | 3.6 km || 
|-id=340 bgcolor=#E9E9E9
| 161340 ||  || — || September 16, 2003 || Palomar || NEAT || ADE || align=right | 4.5 km || 
|-id=341 bgcolor=#E9E9E9
| 161341 ||  || — || September 17, 2003 || Palomar || NEAT || — || align=right | 4.2 km || 
|-id=342 bgcolor=#E9E9E9
| 161342 ||  || — || September 16, 2003 || Anderson Mesa || LONEOS || PAD || align=right | 4.8 km || 
|-id=343 bgcolor=#E9E9E9
| 161343 ||  || — || September 17, 2003 || Kitt Peak || Spacewatch || — || align=right | 3.2 km || 
|-id=344 bgcolor=#E9E9E9
| 161344 ||  || — || September 18, 2003 || Campo Imperatore || CINEOS || — || align=right | 2.1 km || 
|-id=345 bgcolor=#E9E9E9
| 161345 ||  || — || September 18, 2003 || Campo Imperatore || CINEOS || RAF || align=right | 1.2 km || 
|-id=346 bgcolor=#E9E9E9
| 161346 ||  || — || September 18, 2003 || Palomar || NEAT || — || align=right | 2.5 km || 
|-id=347 bgcolor=#E9E9E9
| 161347 ||  || — || September 19, 2003 || Campo Imperatore || CINEOS || — || align=right | 3.8 km || 
|-id=348 bgcolor=#E9E9E9
| 161348 ||  || — || September 20, 2003 || Socorro || LINEAR || RAF || align=right | 1.6 km || 
|-id=349 bgcolor=#E9E9E9
| 161349 Mecsek ||  ||  || September 19, 2003 || Piszkéstető || K. Sárneczky, B. Sipőcz || — || align=right | 2.7 km || 
|-id=350 bgcolor=#E9E9E9
| 161350 ||  || — || September 19, 2003 || Socorro || LINEAR || — || align=right | 1.7 km || 
|-id=351 bgcolor=#E9E9E9
| 161351 ||  || — || September 19, 2003 || Palomar || NEAT || — || align=right | 4.0 km || 
|-id=352 bgcolor=#d6d6d6
| 161352 ||  || — || September 19, 2003 || Palomar || NEAT || TIR || align=right | 5.4 km || 
|-id=353 bgcolor=#E9E9E9
| 161353 ||  || — || September 20, 2003 || Socorro || LINEAR || — || align=right | 2.6 km || 
|-id=354 bgcolor=#E9E9E9
| 161354 ||  || — || September 16, 2003 || Kitt Peak || Spacewatch || — || align=right | 5.1 km || 
|-id=355 bgcolor=#E9E9E9
| 161355 ||  || — || September 19, 2003 || Anderson Mesa || LONEOS || — || align=right | 1.6 km || 
|-id=356 bgcolor=#E9E9E9
| 161356 ||  || — || September 19, 2003 || Anderson Mesa || LONEOS || — || align=right | 3.4 km || 
|-id=357 bgcolor=#E9E9E9
| 161357 ||  || — || September 18, 2003 || Kitt Peak || Spacewatch || AGN || align=right | 2.2 km || 
|-id=358 bgcolor=#E9E9E9
| 161358 ||  || — || September 19, 2003 || Kitt Peak || Spacewatch || HEN || align=right | 1.7 km || 
|-id=359 bgcolor=#E9E9E9
| 161359 ||  || — || September 20, 2003 || Anderson Mesa || LONEOS || — || align=right | 2.8 km || 
|-id=360 bgcolor=#E9E9E9
| 161360 ||  || — || September 20, 2003 || Anderson Mesa || LONEOS || — || align=right | 5.3 km || 
|-id=361 bgcolor=#E9E9E9
| 161361 ||  || — || September 20, 2003 || Anderson Mesa || LONEOS || — || align=right | 2.8 km || 
|-id=362 bgcolor=#E9E9E9
| 161362 ||  || — || September 20, 2003 || Socorro || LINEAR || — || align=right | 2.2 km || 
|-id=363 bgcolor=#E9E9E9
| 161363 ||  || — || September 19, 2003 || Haleakala || NEAT || — || align=right | 3.4 km || 
|-id=364 bgcolor=#E9E9E9
| 161364 ||  || — || September 21, 2003 || Anderson Mesa || LONEOS || — || align=right | 4.6 km || 
|-id=365 bgcolor=#E9E9E9
| 161365 ||  || — || September 21, 2003 || Anderson Mesa || LONEOS || — || align=right | 3.3 km || 
|-id=366 bgcolor=#E9E9E9
| 161366 ||  || — || September 26, 2003 || Socorro || LINEAR || HEN || align=right | 1.6 km || 
|-id=367 bgcolor=#E9E9E9
| 161367 ||  || — || September 23, 2003 || Palomar || NEAT || — || align=right | 1.8 km || 
|-id=368 bgcolor=#E9E9E9
| 161368 ||  || — || September 26, 2003 || Socorro || LINEAR || NEM || align=right | 3.7 km || 
|-id=369 bgcolor=#E9E9E9
| 161369 ||  || — || September 28, 2003 || Kitt Peak || Spacewatch || — || align=right | 2.5 km || 
|-id=370 bgcolor=#E9E9E9
| 161370 ||  || — || September 25, 2003 || Palomar || NEAT || — || align=right | 2.5 km || 
|-id=371 bgcolor=#E9E9E9
| 161371 Bertrandou ||  ||  || September 25, 2003 || Saint-Sulpice || B. Christophe || — || align=right | 2.4 km || 
|-id=372 bgcolor=#E9E9E9
| 161372 ||  || — || September 26, 2003 || Socorro || LINEAR || — || align=right | 5.3 km || 
|-id=373 bgcolor=#E9E9E9
| 161373 ||  || — || September 28, 2003 || Kitt Peak || Spacewatch || — || align=right | 4.1 km || 
|-id=374 bgcolor=#E9E9E9
| 161374 ||  || — || September 27, 2003 || Kitt Peak || Spacewatch || — || align=right | 2.0 km || 
|-id=375 bgcolor=#E9E9E9
| 161375 ||  || — || September 29, 2003 || Socorro || LINEAR || MRX || align=right | 2.3 km || 
|-id=376 bgcolor=#E9E9E9
| 161376 ||  || — || September 29, 2003 || Socorro || LINEAR || — || align=right | 3.5 km || 
|-id=377 bgcolor=#E9E9E9
| 161377 ||  || — || September 26, 2003 || Črni Vrh || Črni Vrh || EUN || align=right | 2.2 km || 
|-id=378 bgcolor=#E9E9E9
| 161378 ||  || — || September 27, 2003 || Kitt Peak || Spacewatch || NEM || align=right | 3.8 km || 
|-id=379 bgcolor=#E9E9E9
| 161379 ||  || — || September 18, 2003 || Haleakala || NEAT || — || align=right | 2.9 km || 
|-id=380 bgcolor=#E9E9E9
| 161380 ||  || — || September 17, 2003 || Palomar || NEAT || MAR || align=right | 2.2 km || 
|-id=381 bgcolor=#E9E9E9
| 161381 ||  || — || October 1, 2003 || Anderson Mesa || LONEOS || — || align=right | 2.4 km || 
|-id=382 bgcolor=#E9E9E9
| 161382 ||  || — || October 14, 2003 || Anderson Mesa || LONEOS || PAD || align=right | 4.5 km || 
|-id=383 bgcolor=#E9E9E9
| 161383 ||  || — || October 15, 2003 || Anderson Mesa || LONEOS || — || align=right | 2.3 km || 
|-id=384 bgcolor=#E9E9E9
| 161384 ||  || — || October 24, 2003 || Wrightwood || J. W. Young || WIT || align=right | 2.0 km || 
|-id=385 bgcolor=#E9E9E9
| 161385 ||  || — || October 23, 2003 || Goodricke-Pigott || R. A. Tucker || MIT || align=right | 3.8 km || 
|-id=386 bgcolor=#E9E9E9
| 161386 ||  || — || October 21, 2003 || Socorro || LINEAR || AGN || align=right | 2.1 km || 
|-id=387 bgcolor=#E9E9E9
| 161387 ||  || — || October 16, 2003 || Anderson Mesa || LONEOS || — || align=right | 1.7 km || 
|-id=388 bgcolor=#E9E9E9
| 161388 ||  || — || October 16, 2003 || Anderson Mesa || LONEOS || — || align=right | 4.7 km || 
|-id=389 bgcolor=#E9E9E9
| 161389 ||  || — || October 17, 2003 || Črni Vrh || Črni Vrh || — || align=right | 3.8 km || 
|-id=390 bgcolor=#E9E9E9
| 161390 ||  || — || October 16, 2003 || Anderson Mesa || LONEOS || EUN || align=right | 2.1 km || 
|-id=391 bgcolor=#E9E9E9
| 161391 ||  || — || October 19, 2003 || Kitt Peak || Spacewatch || AST || align=right | 3.4 km || 
|-id=392 bgcolor=#E9E9E9
| 161392 ||  || — || October 21, 2003 || Socorro || LINEAR || — || align=right | 1.6 km || 
|-id=393 bgcolor=#E9E9E9
| 161393 ||  || — || October 19, 2003 || Kitt Peak || Spacewatch || NEM || align=right | 3.4 km || 
|-id=394 bgcolor=#E9E9E9
| 161394 ||  || — || October 18, 2003 || Palomar || NEAT || — || align=right | 4.9 km || 
|-id=395 bgcolor=#d6d6d6
| 161395 ||  || — || October 19, 2003 || Palomar || NEAT || 615 || align=right | 2.5 km || 
|-id=396 bgcolor=#d6d6d6
| 161396 ||  || — || October 19, 2003 || Palomar || NEAT || SAN || align=right | 3.3 km || 
|-id=397 bgcolor=#E9E9E9
| 161397 ||  || — || October 16, 2003 || Palomar || NEAT || — || align=right | 2.5 km || 
|-id=398 bgcolor=#E9E9E9
| 161398 ||  || — || October 21, 2003 || Socorro || LINEAR || — || align=right | 4.2 km || 
|-id=399 bgcolor=#E9E9E9
| 161399 ||  || — || October 21, 2003 || Socorro || LINEAR || — || align=right | 4.3 km || 
|-id=400 bgcolor=#E9E9E9
| 161400 ||  || — || October 21, 2003 || Socorro || LINEAR || HOF || align=right | 3.8 km || 
|}

161401–161500 

|-bgcolor=#E9E9E9
| 161401 ||  || — || October 21, 2003 || Kitt Peak || Spacewatch || HOF || align=right | 4.7 km || 
|-id=402 bgcolor=#E9E9E9
| 161402 ||  || — || October 22, 2003 || Socorro || LINEAR || AGN || align=right | 2.3 km || 
|-id=403 bgcolor=#E9E9E9
| 161403 ||  || — || October 21, 2003 || Socorro || LINEAR || AGN || align=right | 2.3 km || 
|-id=404 bgcolor=#E9E9E9
| 161404 ||  || — || October 22, 2003 || Kitt Peak || Spacewatch || — || align=right | 3.8 km || 
|-id=405 bgcolor=#E9E9E9
| 161405 ||  || — || October 21, 2003 || Socorro || LINEAR || — || align=right | 3.2 km || 
|-id=406 bgcolor=#E9E9E9
| 161406 ||  || — || October 21, 2003 || Socorro || LINEAR || — || align=right | 2.6 km || 
|-id=407 bgcolor=#fefefe
| 161407 ||  || — || October 23, 2003 || Kitt Peak || Spacewatch || — || align=right | 1.3 km || 
|-id=408 bgcolor=#E9E9E9
| 161408 ||  || — || October 23, 2003 || Kitt Peak || Spacewatch || HOF || align=right | 5.1 km || 
|-id=409 bgcolor=#E9E9E9
| 161409 ||  || — || October 24, 2003 || Socorro || LINEAR || — || align=right | 4.2 km || 
|-id=410 bgcolor=#E9E9E9
| 161410 ||  || — || October 23, 2003 || Kitt Peak || Spacewatch || — || align=right | 4.4 km || 
|-id=411 bgcolor=#E9E9E9
| 161411 ||  || — || October 23, 2003 || Haleakala || NEAT || — || align=right | 4.8 km || 
|-id=412 bgcolor=#E9E9E9
| 161412 ||  || — || October 24, 2003 || Socorro || LINEAR || — || align=right | 3.5 km || 
|-id=413 bgcolor=#E9E9E9
| 161413 ||  || — || October 24, 2003 || Socorro || LINEAR || — || align=right | 2.1 km || 
|-id=414 bgcolor=#E9E9E9
| 161414 ||  || — || October 27, 2003 || Socorro || LINEAR || — || align=right | 3.4 km || 
|-id=415 bgcolor=#E9E9E9
| 161415 ||  || — || October 22, 2003 || Palomar || NEAT || ADE || align=right | 4.0 km || 
|-id=416 bgcolor=#E9E9E9
| 161416 ||  || — || October 24, 2003 || Socorro || LINEAR || — || align=right | 5.9 km || 
|-id=417 bgcolor=#E9E9E9
| 161417 ||  || — || October 27, 2003 || Socorro || LINEAR || — || align=right | 3.7 km || 
|-id=418 bgcolor=#E9E9E9
| 161418 ||  || — || October 28, 2003 || Socorro || LINEAR || HOF || align=right | 4.7 km || 
|-id=419 bgcolor=#E9E9E9
| 161419 ||  || — || October 29, 2003 || Socorro || LINEAR || — || align=right | 1.9 km || 
|-id=420 bgcolor=#d6d6d6
| 161420 ||  || — || October 29, 2003 || Socorro || LINEAR || EUP || align=right | 9.1 km || 
|-id=421 bgcolor=#E9E9E9
| 161421 ||  || — || November 18, 2003 || Palomar || NEAT || — || align=right | 2.4 km || 
|-id=422 bgcolor=#E9E9E9
| 161422 ||  || — || November 18, 2003 || Palomar || NEAT || — || align=right | 2.5 km || 
|-id=423 bgcolor=#E9E9E9
| 161423 ||  || — || November 18, 2003 || Goodricke-Pigott || R. A. Tucker || — || align=right | 3.5 km || 
|-id=424 bgcolor=#fefefe
| 161424 ||  || — || November 19, 2003 || Kitt Peak || Spacewatch || V || align=right data-sort-value="0.92" | 920 m || 
|-id=425 bgcolor=#E9E9E9
| 161425 ||  || — || November 19, 2003 || Kitt Peak || Spacewatch || — || align=right | 2.9 km || 
|-id=426 bgcolor=#E9E9E9
| 161426 ||  || — || November 19, 2003 || Palomar || NEAT || — || align=right | 6.5 km || 
|-id=427 bgcolor=#E9E9E9
| 161427 ||  || — || November 20, 2003 || Socorro || LINEAR || HOF || align=right | 4.3 km || 
|-id=428 bgcolor=#E9E9E9
| 161428 ||  || — || November 18, 2003 || Palomar || NEAT || — || align=right | 3.4 km || 
|-id=429 bgcolor=#E9E9E9
| 161429 ||  || — || November 20, 2003 || Socorro || LINEAR || — || align=right | 5.1 km || 
|-id=430 bgcolor=#E9E9E9
| 161430 ||  || — || November 18, 2003 || Socorro || LINEAR || — || align=right | 2.4 km || 
|-id=431 bgcolor=#E9E9E9
| 161431 ||  || — || November 20, 2003 || Socorro || LINEAR || MAR || align=right | 2.6 km || 
|-id=432 bgcolor=#E9E9E9
| 161432 ||  || — || November 20, 2003 || Socorro || LINEAR || MIT || align=right | 4.5 km || 
|-id=433 bgcolor=#E9E9E9
| 161433 ||  || — || November 21, 2003 || Catalina || CSS || — || align=right | 1.6 km || 
|-id=434 bgcolor=#E9E9E9
| 161434 ||  || — || November 21, 2003 || Socorro || LINEAR || — || align=right | 2.3 km || 
|-id=435 bgcolor=#E9E9E9
| 161435 ||  || — || November 24, 2003 || Anderson Mesa || LONEOS || MRX || align=right | 1.7 km || 
|-id=436 bgcolor=#d6d6d6
| 161436 ||  || — || November 29, 2003 || Socorro || LINEAR || — || align=right | 6.6 km || 
|-id=437 bgcolor=#E9E9E9
| 161437 ||  || — || November 20, 2003 || Palomar || NEAT || GER || align=right | 3.5 km || 
|-id=438 bgcolor=#E9E9E9
| 161438 ||  || — || November 21, 2003 || Palomar || NEAT || ADE || align=right | 4.1 km || 
|-id=439 bgcolor=#E9E9E9
| 161439 ||  || — || November 23, 2003 || Anderson Mesa || LONEOS || DOR || align=right | 4.6 km || 
|-id=440 bgcolor=#E9E9E9
| 161440 ||  || — || November 29, 2003 || Socorro || LINEAR || — || align=right | 2.1 km || 
|-id=441 bgcolor=#E9E9E9
| 161441 ||  || — || December 4, 2003 || Socorro || LINEAR || — || align=right | 4.7 km || 
|-id=442 bgcolor=#d6d6d6
| 161442 ||  || — || December 17, 2003 || Socorro || LINEAR || — || align=right | 6.0 km || 
|-id=443 bgcolor=#d6d6d6
| 161443 ||  || — || December 18, 2003 || Socorro || LINEAR || — || align=right | 5.8 km || 
|-id=444 bgcolor=#d6d6d6
| 161444 ||  || — || December 16, 2003 || Kitt Peak || Spacewatch || — || align=right | 6.7 km || 
|-id=445 bgcolor=#E9E9E9
| 161445 ||  || — || December 17, 2003 || Socorro || LINEAR || — || align=right | 3.5 km || 
|-id=446 bgcolor=#d6d6d6
| 161446 ||  || — || December 17, 2003 || Socorro || LINEAR || EOS || align=right | 3.4 km || 
|-id=447 bgcolor=#d6d6d6
| 161447 ||  || — || December 17, 2003 || Kitt Peak || Spacewatch || — || align=right | 5.5 km || 
|-id=448 bgcolor=#E9E9E9
| 161448 ||  || — || December 19, 2003 || Socorro || LINEAR || — || align=right | 4.9 km || 
|-id=449 bgcolor=#d6d6d6
| 161449 ||  || — || December 21, 2003 || Kitt Peak || Spacewatch || — || align=right | 5.1 km || 
|-id=450 bgcolor=#d6d6d6
| 161450 ||  || — || December 20, 2003 || Socorro || LINEAR || — || align=right | 8.2 km || 
|-id=451 bgcolor=#fefefe
| 161451 ||  || — || December 27, 2003 || Socorro || LINEAR || — || align=right | 1.2 km || 
|-id=452 bgcolor=#E9E9E9
| 161452 ||  || — || December 28, 2003 || Socorro || LINEAR || — || align=right | 4.5 km || 
|-id=453 bgcolor=#E9E9E9
| 161453 ||  || — || December 17, 2003 || Socorro || LINEAR || — || align=right | 3.6 km || 
|-id=454 bgcolor=#fefefe
| 161454 ||  || — || December 18, 2003 || Kitt Peak || Spacewatch || — || align=right | 1.2 km || 
|-id=455 bgcolor=#E9E9E9
| 161455 || 2004 AR || — || January 12, 2004 || Palomar || NEAT || — || align=right | 2.2 km || 
|-id=456 bgcolor=#d6d6d6
| 161456 ||  || — || January 13, 2004 || Palomar || NEAT || EOS || align=right | 3.1 km || 
|-id=457 bgcolor=#d6d6d6
| 161457 || 2004 BV || — || January 16, 2004 || Kitt Peak || Spacewatch || — || align=right | 5.1 km || 
|-id=458 bgcolor=#d6d6d6
| 161458 ||  || — || January 16, 2004 || Palomar || NEAT || VER || align=right | 4.4 km || 
|-id=459 bgcolor=#d6d6d6
| 161459 ||  || — || January 17, 2004 || Kitt Peak || Spacewatch || — || align=right | 6.4 km || 
|-id=460 bgcolor=#fefefe
| 161460 ||  || — || January 21, 2004 || Socorro || LINEAR || — || align=right | 1.3 km || 
|-id=461 bgcolor=#E9E9E9
| 161461 ||  || — || January 23, 2004 || Anderson Mesa || LONEOS || ADE || align=right | 3.1 km || 
|-id=462 bgcolor=#d6d6d6
| 161462 ||  || — || January 26, 2004 || Anderson Mesa || LONEOS || — || align=right | 5.9 km || 
|-id=463 bgcolor=#d6d6d6
| 161463 ||  || — || February 12, 2004 || Palomar || NEAT || EUP || align=right | 8.4 km || 
|-id=464 bgcolor=#fefefe
| 161464 ||  || — || February 10, 2004 || Palomar || NEAT || — || align=right | 1.5 km || 
|-id=465 bgcolor=#E9E9E9
| 161465 ||  || — || February 12, 2004 || Kitt Peak || Spacewatch || HEN || align=right | 1.9 km || 
|-id=466 bgcolor=#d6d6d6
| 161466 ||  || — || February 12, 2004 || Kitt Peak || Spacewatch || — || align=right | 7.5 km || 
|-id=467 bgcolor=#fefefe
| 161467 ||  || — || February 18, 2004 || Socorro || LINEAR || — || align=right | 1.3 km || 
|-id=468 bgcolor=#E9E9E9
| 161468 ||  || — || February 17, 2004 || Socorro || LINEAR || — || align=right | 2.6 km || 
|-id=469 bgcolor=#fefefe
| 161469 ||  || — || March 15, 2004 || Kitt Peak || Spacewatch || NYS || align=right | 1.1 km || 
|-id=470 bgcolor=#fefefe
| 161470 ||  || — || March 15, 2004 || Socorro || LINEAR || — || align=right | 1.0 km || 
|-id=471 bgcolor=#E9E9E9
| 161471 ||  || — || March 16, 2004 || Socorro || LINEAR || — || align=right | 2.5 km || 
|-id=472 bgcolor=#fefefe
| 161472 ||  || — || March 16, 2004 || Socorro || LINEAR || NYS || align=right | 1.0 km || 
|-id=473 bgcolor=#fefefe
| 161473 ||  || — || March 18, 2004 || Socorro || LINEAR || — || align=right | 1.2 km || 
|-id=474 bgcolor=#fefefe
| 161474 ||  || — || March 18, 2004 || Socorro || LINEAR || — || align=right | 1.3 km || 
|-id=475 bgcolor=#fefefe
| 161475 ||  || — || March 19, 2004 || Socorro || LINEAR || NYS || align=right | 1.6 km || 
|-id=476 bgcolor=#fefefe
| 161476 ||  || — || March 23, 2004 || Socorro || LINEAR || — || align=right | 1.8 km || 
|-id=477 bgcolor=#d6d6d6
| 161477 ||  || — || March 18, 2004 || Socorro || LINEAR || FIR || align=right | 5.3 km || 
|-id=478 bgcolor=#d6d6d6
| 161478 ||  || — || April 14, 2004 || Kitt Peak || Spacewatch || 7:4 || align=right | 6.5 km || 
|-id=479 bgcolor=#fefefe
| 161479 ||  || — || April 15, 2004 || Palomar || NEAT || H || align=right | 1.1 km || 
|-id=480 bgcolor=#E9E9E9
| 161480 ||  || — || April 15, 2004 || Anderson Mesa || LONEOS || — || align=right | 2.3 km || 
|-id=481 bgcolor=#fefefe
| 161481 ||  || — || April 14, 2004 || Kitt Peak || Spacewatch || — || align=right | 2.4 km || 
|-id=482 bgcolor=#E9E9E9
| 161482 ||  || — || April 13, 2004 || Kitt Peak || Spacewatch || — || align=right | 3.0 km || 
|-id=483 bgcolor=#fefefe
| 161483 ||  || — || April 14, 2004 || Siding Spring || SSS || — || align=right | 1.5 km || 
|-id=484 bgcolor=#C2FFFF
| 161484 ||  || — || April 20, 2004 || Socorro || LINEAR || L4 || align=right | 17 km || 
|-id=485 bgcolor=#fefefe
| 161485 ||  || — || April 22, 2004 || Siding Spring || SSS || — || align=right | 1.3 km || 
|-id=486 bgcolor=#d6d6d6
| 161486 ||  || — || April 24, 2004 || Kitt Peak || Spacewatch || — || align=right | 3.5 km || 
|-id=487 bgcolor=#fefefe
| 161487 ||  || — || May 10, 2004 || Palomar || NEAT || — || align=right | 1.2 km || 
|-id=488 bgcolor=#fefefe
| 161488 ||  || — || May 13, 2004 || Anderson Mesa || LONEOS || — || align=right | 1.3 km || 
|-id=489 bgcolor=#C2FFFF
| 161489 ||  || — || May 18, 2004 || Socorro || LINEAR || L4 || align=right | 15 km || 
|-id=490 bgcolor=#fefefe
| 161490 ||  || — || May 19, 2004 || Needville || Needville Obs. || FLO || align=right data-sort-value="0.83" | 830 m || 
|-id=491 bgcolor=#d6d6d6
| 161491 ||  || — || May 20, 2004 || Siding Spring || SSS || — || align=right | 4.2 km || 
|-id=492 bgcolor=#E9E9E9
| 161492 ||  || — || June 10, 2004 || Reedy Creek || J. Broughton || — || align=right | 2.6 km || 
|-id=493 bgcolor=#d6d6d6
| 161493 ||  || — || June 9, 2004 || Siding Spring || SSS || — || align=right | 3.2 km || 
|-id=494 bgcolor=#E9E9E9
| 161494 ||  || — || June 11, 2004 || Socorro || LINEAR || — || align=right | 4.5 km || 
|-id=495 bgcolor=#fefefe
| 161495 ||  || — || June 16, 2004 || Socorro || LINEAR || PHO || align=right | 1.6 km || 
|-id=496 bgcolor=#E9E9E9
| 161496 || 2004 NY || — || July 7, 2004 || Campo Imperatore || CINEOS || — || align=right | 4.0 km || 
|-id=497 bgcolor=#E9E9E9
| 161497 ||  || — || July 11, 2004 || Socorro || LINEAR || — || align=right | 1.6 km || 
|-id=498 bgcolor=#d6d6d6
| 161498 ||  || — || August 7, 2004 || Palomar || NEAT || — || align=right | 4.5 km || 
|-id=499 bgcolor=#E9E9E9
| 161499 ||  || — || August 10, 2004 || Socorro || LINEAR || — || align=right | 3.7 km || 
|-id=500 bgcolor=#d6d6d6
| 161500 ||  || — || September 6, 2004 || Siding Spring || SSS || — || align=right | 8.5 km || 
|}

161501–161600 

|-bgcolor=#E9E9E9
| 161501 ||  || — || September 7, 2004 || Socorro || LINEAR || — || align=right | 1.5 km || 
|-id=502 bgcolor=#d6d6d6
| 161502 ||  || — || September 6, 2004 || Palomar || NEAT || VER || align=right | 3.9 km || 
|-id=503 bgcolor=#d6d6d6
| 161503 ||  || — || September 8, 2004 || Socorro || LINEAR || ANF || align=right | 2.3 km || 
|-id=504 bgcolor=#d6d6d6
| 161504 ||  || — || September 8, 2004 || Socorro || LINEAR || — || align=right | 6.7 km || 
|-id=505 bgcolor=#fefefe
| 161505 ||  || — || September 8, 2004 || Socorro || LINEAR || — || align=right | 1.5 km || 
|-id=506 bgcolor=#fefefe
| 161506 ||  || — || September 8, 2004 || Palomar || NEAT || PHO || align=right | 1.9 km || 
|-id=507 bgcolor=#fefefe
| 161507 ||  || — || September 9, 2004 || Socorro || LINEAR || — || align=right | 1.0 km || 
|-id=508 bgcolor=#E9E9E9
| 161508 ||  || — || September 8, 2004 || Socorro || LINEAR || — || align=right | 4.5 km || 
|-id=509 bgcolor=#fefefe
| 161509 ||  || — || September 8, 2004 || Socorro || LINEAR || — || align=right data-sort-value="0.73" | 730 m || 
|-id=510 bgcolor=#fefefe
| 161510 ||  || — || September 9, 2004 || Socorro || LINEAR || FLO || align=right | 1.4 km || 
|-id=511 bgcolor=#d6d6d6
| 161511 ||  || — || September 10, 2004 || Socorro || LINEAR || — || align=right | 5.3 km || 
|-id=512 bgcolor=#d6d6d6
| 161512 ||  || — || September 10, 2004 || Socorro || LINEAR || — || align=right | 5.1 km || 
|-id=513 bgcolor=#FA8072
| 161513 ||  || — || September 10, 2004 || Socorro || LINEAR || — || align=right | 1.3 km || 
|-id=514 bgcolor=#fefefe
| 161514 ||  || — || September 15, 2004 || 7300 Observatory || W. K. Y. Yeung || V || align=right | 1.2 km || 
|-id=515 bgcolor=#d6d6d6
| 161515 ||  || — || September 10, 2004 || Socorro || LINEAR || EOS || align=right | 3.1 km || 
|-id=516 bgcolor=#fefefe
| 161516 ||  || — || September 13, 2004 || Socorro || LINEAR || FLO || align=right data-sort-value="0.86" | 860 m || 
|-id=517 bgcolor=#fefefe
| 161517 ||  || — || September 15, 2004 || Kitt Peak || Spacewatch || FLO || align=right data-sort-value="0.89" | 890 m || 
|-id=518 bgcolor=#d6d6d6
| 161518 ||  || — || September 15, 2004 || Anderson Mesa || LONEOS || — || align=right | 5.9 km || 
|-id=519 bgcolor=#fefefe
| 161519 ||  || — || September 16, 2004 || Siding Spring || SSS || — || align=right | 2.9 km || 
|-id=520 bgcolor=#d6d6d6
| 161520 ||  || — || September 17, 2004 || Socorro || LINEAR || — || align=right | 5.6 km || 
|-id=521 bgcolor=#E9E9E9
| 161521 ||  || — || September 22, 2004 || Kitt Peak || Spacewatch || — || align=right | 3.6 km || 
|-id=522 bgcolor=#E9E9E9
| 161522 ||  || — || September 16, 2004 || Anderson Mesa || LONEOS || INO || align=right | 2.3 km || 
|-id=523 bgcolor=#d6d6d6
| 161523 ||  || — || September 17, 2004 || Socorro || LINEAR || — || align=right | 4.7 km || 
|-id=524 bgcolor=#fefefe
| 161524 ||  || — || October 8, 2004 || Socorro || LINEAR || PHO || align=right | 2.6 km || 
|-id=525 bgcolor=#fefefe
| 161525 ||  || — || October 4, 2004 || Kitt Peak || Spacewatch || — || align=right | 1.0 km || 
|-id=526 bgcolor=#E9E9E9
| 161526 ||  || — || October 7, 2004 || Socorro || LINEAR || EUN || align=right | 1.8 km || 
|-id=527 bgcolor=#E9E9E9
| 161527 ||  || — || October 7, 2004 || Socorro || LINEAR || XIZ || align=right | 2.3 km || 
|-id=528 bgcolor=#fefefe
| 161528 ||  || — || October 7, 2004 || Anderson Mesa || LONEOS || — || align=right | 1.6 km || 
|-id=529 bgcolor=#fefefe
| 161529 ||  || — || October 7, 2004 || Kitt Peak || Spacewatch || — || align=right | 1.3 km || 
|-id=530 bgcolor=#fefefe
| 161530 ||  || — || October 10, 2004 || Kitt Peak || Spacewatch || NYS || align=right | 1.1 km || 
|-id=531 bgcolor=#fefefe
| 161531 ||  || — || October 10, 2004 || Kitt Peak || Spacewatch || — || align=right | 1.4 km || 
|-id=532 bgcolor=#fefefe
| 161532 ||  || — || October 13, 2004 || Kitt Peak || Spacewatch || FLO || align=right | 1.4 km || 
|-id=533 bgcolor=#fefefe
| 161533 ||  || — || October 15, 2004 || Mount Lemmon || Mount Lemmon Survey || — || align=right | 1.5 km || 
|-id=534 bgcolor=#fefefe
| 161534 ||  || — || October 9, 2004 || Anderson Mesa || LONEOS || FLO || align=right | 1.3 km || 
|-id=535 bgcolor=#fefefe
| 161535 ||  || — || November 3, 2004 || Anderson Mesa || LONEOS || — || align=right | 1.2 km || 
|-id=536 bgcolor=#fefefe
| 161536 ||  || — || November 3, 2004 || Palomar || NEAT || — || align=right | 1.4 km || 
|-id=537 bgcolor=#fefefe
| 161537 ||  || — || November 4, 2004 || Catalina || CSS || FLO || align=right data-sort-value="0.91" | 910 m || 
|-id=538 bgcolor=#fefefe
| 161538 ||  || — || November 4, 2004 || Catalina || CSS || FLO || align=right | 1.0 km || 
|-id=539 bgcolor=#fefefe
| 161539 ||  || — || November 5, 2004 || Palomar || NEAT || — || align=right | 2.0 km || 
|-id=540 bgcolor=#d6d6d6
| 161540 ||  || — || November 12, 2004 || Catalina || CSS || — || align=right | 5.4 km || 
|-id=541 bgcolor=#fefefe
| 161541 ||  || — || November 4, 2004 || Kitt Peak || Spacewatch || NYS || align=right | 1.1 km || 
|-id=542 bgcolor=#E9E9E9
| 161542 ||  || — || November 17, 2004 || Siding Spring || SSS || — || align=right | 1.6 km || 
|-id=543 bgcolor=#fefefe
| 161543 ||  || — || November 19, 2004 || Socorro || LINEAR || FLO || align=right | 1.2 km || 
|-id=544 bgcolor=#fefefe
| 161544 ||  || — || December 8, 2004 || Socorro || LINEAR || MAS || align=right | 1.7 km || 
|-id=545 bgcolor=#fefefe
| 161545 Ferrando ||  ||  || December 10, 2004 || La Cañada || J. Lacruz || PHO || align=right | 1.7 km || 
|-id=546 bgcolor=#E9E9E9
| 161546 Schneeweis ||  ||  || December 10, 2004 || Junk Bond || D. Healy || — || align=right | 2.7 km || 
|-id=547 bgcolor=#E9E9E9
| 161547 ||  || — || December 10, 2004 || Socorro || LINEAR || — || align=right | 2.5 km || 
|-id=548 bgcolor=#fefefe
| 161548 ||  || — || December 12, 2004 || Palomar || NEAT || V || align=right | 1.0 km || 
|-id=549 bgcolor=#fefefe
| 161549 ||  || — || December 12, 2004 || Socorro || LINEAR || FLO || align=right | 1.2 km || 
|-id=550 bgcolor=#fefefe
| 161550 ||  || — || December 10, 2004 || Kitt Peak || Spacewatch || NYS || align=right | 1.1 km || 
|-id=551 bgcolor=#FA8072
| 161551 ||  || — || December 14, 2004 || Kitt Peak || Spacewatch || — || align=right | 1.5 km || 
|-id=552 bgcolor=#fefefe
| 161552 ||  || — || December 10, 2004 || Socorro || LINEAR || — || align=right | 1.5 km || 
|-id=553 bgcolor=#fefefe
| 161553 ||  || — || December 14, 2004 || Catalina || CSS || V || align=right data-sort-value="0.97" | 970 m || 
|-id=554 bgcolor=#E9E9E9
| 161554 ||  || — || December 14, 2004 || Catalina || CSS || — || align=right | 4.3 km || 
|-id=555 bgcolor=#fefefe
| 161555 ||  || — || December 15, 2004 || Socorro || LINEAR || — || align=right | 1.5 km || 
|-id=556 bgcolor=#fefefe
| 161556 ||  || — || December 15, 2004 || Socorro || LINEAR || H || align=right data-sort-value="0.99" | 990 m || 
|-id=557 bgcolor=#fefefe
| 161557 ||  || — || December 16, 2004 || Kitt Peak || Spacewatch || NYS || align=right | 1.4 km || 
|-id=558 bgcolor=#fefefe
| 161558 ||  || — || December 18, 2004 || Mount Lemmon || Mount Lemmon Survey || NYS || align=right | 1.4 km || 
|-id=559 bgcolor=#fefefe
| 161559 ||  || — || December 18, 2004 || Mount Lemmon || Mount Lemmon Survey || — || align=right | 1.4 km || 
|-id=560 bgcolor=#E9E9E9
| 161560 ||  || — || December 18, 2004 || Mount Lemmon || Mount Lemmon Survey || — || align=right | 2.6 km || 
|-id=561 bgcolor=#E9E9E9
| 161561 ||  || — || January 6, 2005 || Catalina || CSS || — || align=right | 1.6 km || 
|-id=562 bgcolor=#E9E9E9
| 161562 ||  || — || January 6, 2005 || Catalina || CSS || — || align=right | 1.8 km || 
|-id=563 bgcolor=#fefefe
| 161563 ||  || — || January 6, 2005 || Socorro || LINEAR || MAS || align=right | 1.4 km || 
|-id=564 bgcolor=#E9E9E9
| 161564 ||  || — || January 13, 2005 || Socorro || LINEAR || — || align=right | 3.9 km || 
|-id=565 bgcolor=#d6d6d6
| 161565 ||  || — || January 15, 2005 || Kitt Peak || Spacewatch || SAN || align=right | 3.0 km || 
|-id=566 bgcolor=#d6d6d6
| 161566 ||  || — || January 13, 2005 || Kitt Peak || Spacewatch || LIX || align=right | 6.1 km || 
|-id=567 bgcolor=#E9E9E9
| 161567 || 2005 BX || — || January 16, 2005 || Hormersdorf || J. Lorenz || — || align=right | 1.7 km || 
|-id=568 bgcolor=#E9E9E9
| 161568 ||  || — || January 17, 2005 || Socorro || LINEAR || PAD || align=right | 3.9 km || 
|-id=569 bgcolor=#E9E9E9
| 161569 ||  || — || January 16, 2005 || Kitt Peak || Spacewatch || — || align=right | 2.2 km || 
|-id=570 bgcolor=#d6d6d6
| 161570 ||  || — || January 17, 2005 || Kitt Peak || Spacewatch || HYG || align=right | 5.0 km || 
|-id=571 bgcolor=#d6d6d6
| 161571 ||  || — || February 1, 2005 || Kitt Peak || Spacewatch || — || align=right | 6.8 km || 
|-id=572 bgcolor=#d6d6d6
| 161572 ||  || — || February 2, 2005 || Socorro || LINEAR || EMA || align=right | 6.2 km || 
|-id=573 bgcolor=#d6d6d6
| 161573 ||  || — || February 2, 2005 || Catalina || CSS || HYG || align=right | 4.4 km || 
|-id=574 bgcolor=#d6d6d6
| 161574 || 2005 DS || — || February 28, 2005 || Junk Bond || Junk Bond Obs. || — || align=right | 5.6 km || 
|-id=575 bgcolor=#d6d6d6
| 161575 ||  || — || March 2, 2005 || Kitt Peak || Spacewatch || — || align=right | 4.9 km || 
|-id=576 bgcolor=#d6d6d6
| 161576 ||  || — || March 3, 2005 || Catalina || CSS || — || align=right | 4.5 km || 
|-id=577 bgcolor=#d6d6d6
| 161577 ||  || — || March 2, 2005 || Catalina || CSS || — || align=right | 4.2 km || 
|-id=578 bgcolor=#d6d6d6
| 161578 ||  || — || March 4, 2005 || Socorro || LINEAR || EOS || align=right | 3.8 km || 
|-id=579 bgcolor=#fefefe
| 161579 ||  || — || March 8, 2005 || Socorro || LINEAR || NYS || align=right data-sort-value="0.68" | 680 m || 
|-id=580 bgcolor=#d6d6d6
| 161580 ||  || — || March 8, 2005 || Mount Lemmon || Mount Lemmon Survey || — || align=right | 5.3 km || 
|-id=581 bgcolor=#d6d6d6
| 161581 ||  || — || March 11, 2005 || Kitt Peak || Spacewatch || TIR || align=right | 5.1 km || 
|-id=582 bgcolor=#fefefe
| 161582 ||  || — || March 10, 2005 || Mount Lemmon || Mount Lemmon Survey || — || align=right | 1.3 km || 
|-id=583 bgcolor=#E9E9E9
| 161583 ||  || — || April 6, 2005 || Anderson Mesa || LONEOS || MIT || align=right | 3.3 km || 
|-id=584 bgcolor=#d6d6d6
| 161584 ||  || — || April 7, 2005 || Kitt Peak || Spacewatch || — || align=right | 5.1 km || 
|-id=585 bgcolor=#d6d6d6
| 161585 Danielhals ||  ||  || April 10, 2005 || Kitt Peak || M. W. Buie || THM || align=right | 3.4 km || 
|-id=586 bgcolor=#fefefe
| 161586 ||  || — || May 10, 2005 || Mount Lemmon || Mount Lemmon Survey || V || align=right data-sort-value="0.96" | 960 m || 
|-id=587 bgcolor=#fefefe
| 161587 ||  || — || June 1, 2005 || Kitt Peak || Spacewatch || — || align=right | 1.4 km || 
|-id=588 bgcolor=#d6d6d6
| 161588 ||  || — || June 12, 2005 || Kitt Peak || Spacewatch || — || align=right | 3.4 km || 
|-id=589 bgcolor=#E9E9E9
| 161589 ||  || — || June 29, 2005 || Palomar || NEAT || — || align=right | 1.7 km || 
|-id=590 bgcolor=#d6d6d6
| 161590 ||  || — || July 8, 2005 || Kitt Peak || Spacewatch || — || align=right | 5.8 km || 
|-id=591 bgcolor=#fefefe
| 161591 ||  || — || July 31, 2005 || Siding Spring || SSS || MAS || align=right | 1.4 km || 
|-id=592 bgcolor=#E9E9E9
| 161592 Sarahhamilton ||  ||  || August 10, 2005 || Cerro Tololo || M. W. Buie || — || align=right data-sort-value="0.87" | 870 m || 
|-id=593 bgcolor=#fefefe
| 161593 ||  || — || August 28, 2005 || Junk Bond || D. Healy || SUL || align=right | 3.0 km || 
|-id=594 bgcolor=#fefefe
| 161594 ||  || — || August 29, 2005 || Palomar || NEAT || FLO || align=right | 1.2 km || 
|-id=595 bgcolor=#d6d6d6
| 161595 ||  || — || September 25, 2005 || Calvin-Rehoboth || Calvin–Rehoboth Obs. || — || align=right | 3.9 km || 
|-id=596 bgcolor=#fefefe
| 161596 ||  || — || September 24, 2005 || Kitt Peak || Spacewatch || FLO || align=right | 1.0 km || 
|-id=597 bgcolor=#E9E9E9
| 161597 ||  || — || September 24, 2005 || Kitt Peak || Spacewatch || — || align=right | 2.1 km || 
|-id=598 bgcolor=#E9E9E9
| 161598 ||  || — || September 29, 2005 || Mount Lemmon || Mount Lemmon Survey || MRX || align=right | 1.8 km || 
|-id=599 bgcolor=#fefefe
| 161599 ||  || — || September 25, 2005 || Kitt Peak || Spacewatch || — || align=right data-sort-value="0.88" | 880 m || 
|-id=600 bgcolor=#fefefe
| 161600 ||  || — || October 1, 2005 || Kitt Peak || Spacewatch || — || align=right | 2.8 km || 
|}

161601–161700 

|-bgcolor=#E9E9E9
| 161601 ||  || — || October 3, 2005 || Catalina || CSS || — || align=right | 3.5 km || 
|-id=602 bgcolor=#E9E9E9
| 161602 ||  || — || October 7, 2005 || Kitt Peak || Spacewatch || — || align=right | 1.2 km || 
|-id=603 bgcolor=#d6d6d6
| 161603 ||  || — || October 9, 2005 || Kitt Peak || Spacewatch || KAR || align=right | 1.6 km || 
|-id=604 bgcolor=#fefefe
| 161604 ||  || — || October 1, 2005 || Anderson Mesa || LONEOS || — || align=right | 1.2 km || 
|-id=605 bgcolor=#E9E9E9
| 161605 ||  || — || October 1, 2005 || Catalina || CSS || GEF || align=right | 1.9 km || 
|-id=606 bgcolor=#d6d6d6
| 161606 ||  || — || October 24, 2005 || Kitt Peak || Spacewatch || 3:2 || align=right | 7.8 km || 
|-id=607 bgcolor=#fefefe
| 161607 ||  || — || October 23, 2005 || Catalina || CSS || — || align=right | 1.3 km || 
|-id=608 bgcolor=#d6d6d6
| 161608 ||  || — || October 23, 2005 || Catalina || CSS || EUP || align=right | 7.8 km || 
|-id=609 bgcolor=#E9E9E9
| 161609 ||  || — || October 22, 2005 || Kitt Peak || Spacewatch || JUN || align=right | 1.5 km || 
|-id=610 bgcolor=#d6d6d6
| 161610 ||  || — || October 22, 2005 || Kitt Peak || Spacewatch || THM || align=right | 3.1 km || 
|-id=611 bgcolor=#fefefe
| 161611 ||  || — || October 22, 2005 || Kitt Peak || Spacewatch || — || align=right | 1.2 km || 
|-id=612 bgcolor=#fefefe
| 161612 ||  || — || October 24, 2005 || Kitt Peak || Spacewatch || NYS || align=right | 1.2 km || 
|-id=613 bgcolor=#E9E9E9
| 161613 ||  || — || October 24, 2005 || Palomar || NEAT || — || align=right | 2.8 km || 
|-id=614 bgcolor=#E9E9E9
| 161614 ||  || — || October 28, 2005 || Kitt Peak || Spacewatch || — || align=right | 1.1 km || 
|-id=615 bgcolor=#fefefe
| 161615 ||  || — || October 29, 2005 || Catalina || CSS || V || align=right | 1.0 km || 
|-id=616 bgcolor=#d6d6d6
| 161616 ||  || — || October 27, 2005 || Palomar || NEAT || — || align=right | 5.0 km || 
|-id=617 bgcolor=#d6d6d6
| 161617 ||  || — || October 23, 2005 || Catalina || CSS || EOS || align=right | 2.8 km || 
|-id=618 bgcolor=#E9E9E9
| 161618 ||  || — || November 11, 2005 || Kitt Peak || Spacewatch || MIS || align=right | 3.6 km || 
|-id=619 bgcolor=#fefefe
| 161619 ||  || — || November 5, 2005 || Kitt Peak || Spacewatch || — || align=right | 1.6 km || 
|-id=620 bgcolor=#d6d6d6
| 161620 ||  || — || November 25, 2005 || Catalina || CSS || — || align=right | 3.3 km || 
|-id=621 bgcolor=#d6d6d6
| 161621 ||  || — || November 25, 2005 || Mount Lemmon || Mount Lemmon Survey || — || align=right | 4.1 km || 
|-id=622 bgcolor=#E9E9E9
| 161622 ||  || — || November 29, 2005 || Mount Lemmon || Mount Lemmon Survey || AGN || align=right | 1.6 km || 
|-id=623 bgcolor=#E9E9E9
| 161623 ||  || — || November 26, 2005 || Mount Lemmon || Mount Lemmon Survey || — || align=right | 3.0 km || 
|-id=624 bgcolor=#d6d6d6
| 161624 ||  || — || November 29, 2005 || Kitt Peak || Spacewatch || — || align=right | 3.1 km || 
|-id=625 bgcolor=#E9E9E9
| 161625 ||  || — || December 22, 2005 || Catalina || CSS || IAN || align=right | 1.5 km || 
|-id=626 bgcolor=#fefefe
| 161626 ||  || — || December 22, 2005 || Kitt Peak || Spacewatch || — || align=right | 2.8 km || 
|-id=627 bgcolor=#fefefe
| 161627 ||  || — || December 22, 2005 || Kitt Peak || Spacewatch || FLO || align=right | 1.3 km || 
|-id=628 bgcolor=#d6d6d6
| 161628 ||  || — || December 25, 2005 || Kitt Peak || Spacewatch || KOR || align=right | 2.3 km || 
|-id=629 bgcolor=#fefefe
| 161629 ||  || — || December 25, 2005 || Catalina || CSS || — || align=right | 1.5 km || 
|-id=630 bgcolor=#fefefe
| 161630 ||  || — || December 27, 2005 || Catalina || CSS || H || align=right data-sort-value="0.91" | 910 m || 
|-id=631 bgcolor=#fefefe
| 161631 ||  || — || December 25, 2005 || Kitt Peak || Spacewatch || — || align=right | 1.5 km || 
|-id=632 bgcolor=#fefefe
| 161632 ||  || — || December 30, 2005 || Kitt Peak || Spacewatch || NYS || align=right data-sort-value="0.84" | 840 m || 
|-id=633 bgcolor=#fefefe
| 161633 ||  || — || December 30, 2005 || Mount Lemmon || Mount Lemmon Survey || — || align=right | 1.4 km || 
|-id=634 bgcolor=#FA8072
| 161634 ||  || — || December 25, 2005 || Kitt Peak || Spacewatch || — || align=right | 1.3 km || 
|-id=635 bgcolor=#d6d6d6
| 161635 ||  || — || December 25, 2005 || Mount Lemmon || Mount Lemmon Survey || THM || align=right | 3.2 km || 
|-id=636 bgcolor=#fefefe
| 161636 ||  || — || January 5, 2006 || Kitt Peak || Spacewatch || — || align=right | 1.5 km || 
|-id=637 bgcolor=#d6d6d6
| 161637 ||  || — || January 8, 2006 || Kitt Peak || Spacewatch || FIR || align=right | 5.6 km || 
|-id=638 bgcolor=#d6d6d6
| 161638 ||  || — || January 5, 2006 || Mount Lemmon || Mount Lemmon Survey || — || align=right | 3.6 km || 
|-id=639 bgcolor=#E9E9E9
| 161639 ||  || — || January 4, 2006 || Kitt Peak || Spacewatch || — || align=right | 3.0 km || 
|-id=640 bgcolor=#fefefe
| 161640 ||  || — || January 21, 2006 || Mount Lemmon || Mount Lemmon Survey || — || align=right | 1.1 km || 
|-id=641 bgcolor=#fefefe
| 161641 ||  || — || January 20, 2006 || Kitt Peak || Spacewatch || NYS || align=right | 1.2 km || 
|-id=642 bgcolor=#fefefe
| 161642 ||  || — || January 22, 2006 || Mount Lemmon || Mount Lemmon Survey || — || align=right | 1.2 km || 
|-id=643 bgcolor=#fefefe
| 161643 ||  || — || January 23, 2006 || Mount Lemmon || Mount Lemmon Survey || FLO || align=right | 1.1 km || 
|-id=644 bgcolor=#fefefe
| 161644 ||  || — || January 20, 2006 || Kitt Peak || Spacewatch || NYS || align=right | 1.3 km || 
|-id=645 bgcolor=#fefefe
| 161645 ||  || — || January 21, 2006 || Kitt Peak || Spacewatch || — || align=right | 1.4 km || 
|-id=646 bgcolor=#C2FFFF
| 161646 ||  || — || January 21, 2006 || Mount Lemmon || Mount Lemmon Survey || L5 || align=right | 9.7 km || 
|-id=647 bgcolor=#E9E9E9
| 161647 ||  || — || January 23, 2006 || Kitt Peak || Spacewatch || — || align=right | 2.0 km || 
|-id=648 bgcolor=#fefefe
| 161648 ||  || — || January 25, 2006 || Kitt Peak || Spacewatch || PHO || align=right | 3.0 km || 
|-id=649 bgcolor=#fefefe
| 161649 ||  || — || January 26, 2006 || Kitt Peak || Spacewatch || FLO || align=right | 1.2 km || 
|-id=650 bgcolor=#E9E9E9
| 161650 ||  || — || January 26, 2006 || Mount Lemmon || Mount Lemmon Survey || — || align=right | 1.8 km || 
|-id=651 bgcolor=#d6d6d6
| 161651 ||  || — || January 27, 2006 || Kitt Peak || Spacewatch || — || align=right | 4.2 km || 
|-id=652 bgcolor=#fefefe
| 161652 ||  || — || January 27, 2006 || Mount Lemmon || Mount Lemmon Survey || — || align=right | 1.3 km || 
|-id=653 bgcolor=#E9E9E9
| 161653 ||  || — || January 31, 2006 || Mount Lemmon || Mount Lemmon Survey || — || align=right | 1.6 km || 
|-id=654 bgcolor=#fefefe
| 161654 ||  || — || January 31, 2006 || Kitt Peak || Spacewatch || — || align=right | 3.3 km || 
|-id=655 bgcolor=#d6d6d6
| 161655 ||  || — || January 31, 2006 || Kitt Peak || Spacewatch || — || align=right | 4.5 km || 
|-id=656 bgcolor=#fefefe
| 161656 ||  || — || January 31, 2006 || Kitt Peak || Spacewatch || MAS || align=right | 1.1 km || 
|-id=657 bgcolor=#E9E9E9
| 161657 ||  || — || January 27, 2006 || Catalina || CSS || — || align=right | 2.2 km || 
|-id=658 bgcolor=#E9E9E9
| 161658 ||  || — || January 28, 2006 || Anderson Mesa || LONEOS || — || align=right | 1.6 km || 
|-id=659 bgcolor=#E9E9E9
| 161659 ||  || — || February 1, 2006 || Kitt Peak || Spacewatch || — || align=right | 2.0 km || 
|-id=660 bgcolor=#fefefe
| 161660 ||  || — || February 2, 2006 || Mount Lemmon || Mount Lemmon Survey || — || align=right | 1.3 km || 
|-id=661 bgcolor=#fefefe
| 161661 ||  || — || February 6, 2006 || Mount Lemmon || Mount Lemmon Survey || MAS || align=right | 1.3 km || 
|-id=662 bgcolor=#fefefe
| 161662 ||  || — || February 6, 2006 || Mount Lemmon || Mount Lemmon Survey || — || align=right | 1.7 km || 
|-id=663 bgcolor=#fefefe
| 161663 ||  || — || February 20, 2006 || Catalina || CSS || NYS || align=right | 1.1 km || 
|-id=664 bgcolor=#C2FFFF
| 161664 ||  || — || February 20, 2006 || Kitt Peak || Spacewatch || L5 || align=right | 16 km || 
|-id=665 bgcolor=#fefefe
| 161665 ||  || — || February 21, 2006 || Catalina || CSS || V || align=right | 1.0 km || 
|-id=666 bgcolor=#fefefe
| 161666 ||  || — || February 24, 2006 || Mount Lemmon || Mount Lemmon Survey || — || align=right | 1.5 km || 
|-id=667 bgcolor=#fefefe
| 161667 ||  || — || February 21, 2006 || Mount Lemmon || Mount Lemmon Survey || NYS || align=right | 1.1 km || 
|-id=668 bgcolor=#fefefe
| 161668 ||  || — || February 24, 2006 || Kitt Peak || Spacewatch || MAS || align=right | 1.4 km || 
|-id=669 bgcolor=#fefefe
| 161669 ||  || — || February 24, 2006 || Kitt Peak || Spacewatch || NYS || align=right | 1.4 km || 
|-id=670 bgcolor=#fefefe
| 161670 ||  || — || February 24, 2006 || Kitt Peak || Spacewatch || MAS || align=right | 1.4 km || 
|-id=671 bgcolor=#fefefe
| 161671 ||  || — || February 24, 2006 || Kitt Peak || Spacewatch || V || align=right | 1.2 km || 
|-id=672 bgcolor=#fefefe
| 161672 ||  || — || February 25, 2006 || Mount Lemmon || Mount Lemmon Survey || V || align=right data-sort-value="0.99" | 990 m || 
|-id=673 bgcolor=#E9E9E9
| 161673 ||  || — || February 24, 2006 || Kitt Peak || Spacewatch || — || align=right | 1.4 km || 
|-id=674 bgcolor=#fefefe
| 161674 ||  || — || March 2, 2006 || Kitt Peak || Spacewatch || — || align=right | 1.7 km || 
|-id=675 bgcolor=#fefefe
| 161675 ||  || — || March 22, 2006 || Catalina || CSS || — || align=right | 1.5 km || 
|-id=676 bgcolor=#d6d6d6
| 161676 ||  || — || March 23, 2006 || Kitt Peak || Spacewatch || — || align=right | 5.2 km || 
|-id=677 bgcolor=#fefefe
| 161677 ||  || — || March 23, 2006 || Kitt Peak || Spacewatch || — || align=right | 1.6 km || 
|-id=678 bgcolor=#d6d6d6
| 161678 ||  || — || March 23, 2006 || Mount Lemmon || Mount Lemmon Survey || — || align=right | 5.5 km || 
|-id=679 bgcolor=#d6d6d6
| 161679 ||  || — || March 23, 2006 || Catalina || CSS || ITH || align=right | 2.6 km || 
|-id=680 bgcolor=#d6d6d6
| 161680 ||  || — || April 2, 2006 || Kitt Peak || Spacewatch || HYG || align=right | 4.8 km || 
|-id=681 bgcolor=#fefefe
| 161681 ||  || — || April 2, 2006 || Kitt Peak || Spacewatch || MAS || align=right | 2.0 km || 
|-id=682 bgcolor=#fefefe
| 161682 ||  || — || April 7, 2006 || Mount Lemmon || Mount Lemmon Survey || EUT || align=right | 1.4 km || 
|-id=683 bgcolor=#E9E9E9
| 161683 ||  || — || April 12, 2006 || Palomar || NEAT || — || align=right | 4.0 km || 
|-id=684 bgcolor=#E9E9E9
| 161684 ||  || — || April 8, 2006 || Siding Spring || SSS || — || align=right | 2.4 km || 
|-id=685 bgcolor=#E9E9E9
| 161685 ||  || — || April 9, 2006 || Catalina || CSS || — || align=right | 3.7 km || 
|-id=686 bgcolor=#d6d6d6
| 161686 ||  || — || April 19, 2006 || Anderson Mesa || LONEOS || — || align=right | 6.4 km || 
|-id=687 bgcolor=#E9E9E9
| 161687 ||  || — || April 20, 2006 || Kitt Peak || Spacewatch || — || align=right | 2.0 km || 
|-id=688 bgcolor=#d6d6d6
| 161688 ||  || — || April 20, 2006 || Kitt Peak || Spacewatch || EOS || align=right | 3.7 km || 
|-id=689 bgcolor=#E9E9E9
| 161689 ||  || — || April 19, 2006 || Catalina || CSS || JUN || align=right | 2.1 km || 
|-id=690 bgcolor=#fefefe
| 161690 ||  || — || April 19, 2006 || Kitt Peak || Spacewatch || — || align=right | 3.1 km || 
|-id=691 bgcolor=#d6d6d6
| 161691 ||  || — || April 21, 2006 || Kitt Peak || Spacewatch || BRA || align=right | 2.6 km || 
|-id=692 bgcolor=#d6d6d6
| 161692 ||  || — || April 24, 2006 || Mount Lemmon || Mount Lemmon Survey || — || align=right | 4.6 km || 
|-id=693 bgcolor=#E9E9E9
| 161693 Attilladanko ||  ||  || April 26, 2006 || RAS || A. Lowe || CLO || align=right | 5.3 km || 
|-id=694 bgcolor=#fefefe
| 161694 ||  || — || April 19, 2006 || Anderson Mesa || LONEOS || — || align=right | 1.5 km || 
|-id=695 bgcolor=#d6d6d6
| 161695 ||  || — || April 26, 2006 || Kitt Peak || Spacewatch || EOS || align=right | 3.5 km || 
|-id=696 bgcolor=#E9E9E9
| 161696 ||  || — || April 26, 2006 || Kitt Peak || Spacewatch || HOF || align=right | 5.1 km || 
|-id=697 bgcolor=#E9E9E9
| 161697 ||  || — || April 19, 2006 || Catalina || CSS || — || align=right | 2.9 km || 
|-id=698 bgcolor=#d6d6d6
| 161698 ||  || — || April 30, 2006 || Kitt Peak || Spacewatch || THM || align=right | 3.2 km || 
|-id=699 bgcolor=#d6d6d6
| 161699 Lisahardaway ||  ||  || April 26, 2006 || Cerro Tololo || M. W. Buie || THM || align=right | 3.9 km || 
|-id=700 bgcolor=#d6d6d6
| 161700 ||  || — || May 3, 2006 || Kitt Peak || Spacewatch || LIX || align=right | 6.2 km || 
|}

161701–161800 

|-bgcolor=#C2FFFF
| 161701 ||  || — || May 7, 2006 || Kitt Peak || Spacewatch || L4 || align=right | 15 km || 
|-id=702 bgcolor=#d6d6d6
| 161702 ||  || — || May 5, 2006 || Anderson Mesa || LONEOS || EOS || align=right | 3.9 km || 
|-id=703 bgcolor=#d6d6d6
| 161703 ||  || — || May 5, 2006 || Anderson Mesa || LONEOS || — || align=right | 6.5 km || 
|-id=704 bgcolor=#E9E9E9
| 161704 ||  || — || May 1, 2006 || Catalina || CSS || — || align=right | 2.3 km || 
|-id=705 bgcolor=#d6d6d6
| 161705 || 2006 KJ || — || May 16, 2006 || Palomar || NEAT || — || align=right | 6.8 km || 
|-id=706 bgcolor=#fefefe
| 161706 ||  || — || May 17, 2006 || Siding Spring || SSS || V || align=right | 1.1 km || 
|-id=707 bgcolor=#E9E9E9
| 161707 ||  || — || May 18, 2006 || Palomar || NEAT || HEN || align=right | 2.1 km || 
|-id=708 bgcolor=#d6d6d6
| 161708 ||  || — || May 24, 2006 || Mount Lemmon || Mount Lemmon Survey || ALA || align=right | 4.9 km || 
|-id=709 bgcolor=#E9E9E9
| 161709 ||  || — || May 21, 2006 || Kitt Peak || Spacewatch || — || align=right | 1.7 km || 
|-id=710 bgcolor=#fefefe
| 161710 ||  || — || May 24, 2006 || Palomar || NEAT || — || align=right | 1.3 km || 
|-id=711 bgcolor=#d6d6d6
| 161711 ||  || — || May 26, 2006 || Kitt Peak || Spacewatch || — || align=right | 6.5 km || 
|-id=712 bgcolor=#E9E9E9
| 161712 ||  || — || May 24, 2006 || Mount Lemmon || Mount Lemmon Survey || WIT || align=right | 1.5 km || 
|-id=713 bgcolor=#E9E9E9
| 161713 ||  || — || May 31, 2006 || Mount Lemmon || Mount Lemmon Survey || HNA || align=right | 3.4 km || 
|-id=714 bgcolor=#d6d6d6
| 161714 || 2006 MH || — || June 16, 2006 || Kitt Peak || Spacewatch || — || align=right | 7.0 km || 
|-id=715 bgcolor=#E9E9E9
| 161715 Wenchuan ||  ||  || June 23, 2006 || Lulin Observatory || Q.-z. Ye, T.-C. Yang || — || align=right | 1.8 km || 
|-id=716 bgcolor=#fefefe
| 161716 ||  || — || July 26, 2006 || Siding Spring || SSS || H || align=right | 1.2 km || 
|-id=717 bgcolor=#C2FFFF
| 161717 ||  || — || August 12, 2006 || Palomar || NEAT || L4 || align=right | 19 km || 
|-id=718 bgcolor=#d6d6d6
| 161718 ||  || — || August 21, 2006 || Kitt Peak || Spacewatch || THM || align=right | 3.1 km || 
|-id=719 bgcolor=#E9E9E9
| 161719 ||  || — || August 29, 2006 || Catalina || CSS || — || align=right | 3.5 km || 
|-id=720 bgcolor=#E9E9E9
| 161720 ||  || — || August 16, 2006 || Palomar || NEAT || HOF || align=right | 4.3 km || 
|-id=721 bgcolor=#E9E9E9
| 161721 ||  || — || September 12, 2006 || Catalina || CSS || EUN || align=right | 1.8 km || 
|-id=722 bgcolor=#E9E9E9
| 161722 ||  || — || September 15, 2006 || Socorro || LINEAR || — || align=right | 3.3 km || 
|-id=723 bgcolor=#d6d6d6
| 161723 ||  || — || September 15, 2006 || Kitt Peak || Spacewatch || HYG || align=right | 4.6 km || 
|-id=724 bgcolor=#E9E9E9
| 161724 ||  || — || September 14, 2006 || Catalina || CSS || — || align=right | 2.1 km || 
|-id=725 bgcolor=#fefefe
| 161725 ||  || — || September 14, 2006 || Catalina || CSS || — || align=right | 1.2 km || 
|-id=726 bgcolor=#E9E9E9
| 161726 ||  || — || September 15, 2006 || Kitt Peak || Spacewatch || HEN || align=right | 1.8 km || 
|-id=727 bgcolor=#fefefe
| 161727 ||  || — || September 16, 2006 || Socorro || LINEAR || — || align=right | 1.4 km || 
|-id=728 bgcolor=#d6d6d6
| 161728 ||  || — || September 18, 2006 || Goodricke-Pigott || R. A. Tucker || — || align=right | 6.5 km || 
|-id=729 bgcolor=#d6d6d6
| 161729 ||  || — || September 18, 2006 || Catalina || CSS || — || align=right | 6.2 km || 
|-id=730 bgcolor=#fefefe
| 161730 ||  || — || September 16, 2006 || Catalina || CSS || V || align=right | 1.0 km || 
|-id=731 bgcolor=#d6d6d6
| 161731 ||  || — || September 17, 2006 || Anderson Mesa || LONEOS || EOS || align=right | 3.5 km || 
|-id=732 bgcolor=#fefefe
| 161732 ||  || — || September 18, 2006 || Catalina || CSS || — || align=right | 1.3 km || 
|-id=733 bgcolor=#d6d6d6
| 161733 ||  || — || September 17, 2006 || Anderson Mesa || LONEOS || EUP || align=right | 6.5 km || 
|-id=734 bgcolor=#fefefe
| 161734 ||  || — || September 18, 2006 || Kitt Peak || Spacewatch || NYS || align=right data-sort-value="0.82" | 820 m || 
|-id=735 bgcolor=#fefefe
| 161735 ||  || — || September 18, 2006 || Kitt Peak || Spacewatch || V || align=right data-sort-value="0.89" | 890 m || 
|-id=736 bgcolor=#fefefe
| 161736 ||  || — || September 18, 2006 || Catalina || CSS || V || align=right data-sort-value="0.92" | 920 m || 
|-id=737 bgcolor=#d6d6d6
| 161737 ||  || — || September 18, 2006 || Catalina || CSS || LIX || align=right | 4.8 km || 
|-id=738 bgcolor=#E9E9E9
| 161738 ||  || — || September 20, 2006 || Socorro || LINEAR || slow || align=right | 4.4 km || 
|-id=739 bgcolor=#fefefe
| 161739 ||  || — || September 21, 2006 || Anderson Mesa || LONEOS || FLO || align=right | 1.1 km || 
|-id=740 bgcolor=#d6d6d6
| 161740 ||  || — || September 20, 2006 || Palomar || NEAT || — || align=right | 5.1 km || 
|-id=741 bgcolor=#d6d6d6
| 161741 ||  || — || September 25, 2006 || Kitt Peak || Spacewatch || — || align=right | 4.5 km || 
|-id=742 bgcolor=#fefefe
| 161742 ||  || — || September 26, 2006 || Kitt Peak || Spacewatch || NYS || align=right data-sort-value="0.94" | 940 m || 
|-id=743 bgcolor=#E9E9E9
| 161743 ||  || — || September 26, 2006 || Mount Lemmon || Mount Lemmon Survey || — || align=right | 3.2 km || 
|-id=744 bgcolor=#fefefe
| 161744 ||  || — || September 26, 2006 || Kitt Peak || Spacewatch || MAS || align=right data-sort-value="0.88" | 880 m || 
|-id=745 bgcolor=#fefefe
| 161745 ||  || — || September 26, 2006 || Mount Lemmon || Mount Lemmon Survey || — || align=right data-sort-value="0.90" | 900 m || 
|-id=746 bgcolor=#E9E9E9
| 161746 ||  || — || September 26, 2006 || Kitt Peak || Spacewatch || MIT || align=right | 4.0 km || 
|-id=747 bgcolor=#fefefe
| 161747 ||  || — || September 27, 2006 || Socorro || LINEAR || NYS || align=right | 1.0 km || 
|-id=748 bgcolor=#d6d6d6
| 161748 ||  || — || September 27, 2006 || Mount Lemmon || Mount Lemmon Survey || — || align=right | 5.9 km || 
|-id=749 bgcolor=#E9E9E9
| 161749 ||  || — || September 27, 2006 || Mount Lemmon || Mount Lemmon Survey || — || align=right | 2.6 km || 
|-id=750 bgcolor=#E9E9E9
| 161750 Garyladd ||  ||  || September 25, 2006 || Mount Lemmon || Mount Lemmon Survey || — || align=right | 1.7 km || 
|-id=751 bgcolor=#fefefe
| 161751 ||  || — || September 22, 2006 || Catalina || CSS || — || align=right | 4.4 km || 
|-id=752 bgcolor=#fefefe
| 161752 ||  || — || September 26, 2006 || Siding Spring || SSS || H || align=right | 1.1 km || 
|-id=753 bgcolor=#d6d6d6
| 161753 ||  || — || September 27, 2006 || Kitt Peak || Spacewatch || — || align=right | 4.8 km || 
|-id=754 bgcolor=#d6d6d6
| 161754 ||  || — || September 30, 2006 || Catalina || CSS || — || align=right | 6.4 km || 
|-id=755 bgcolor=#fefefe
| 161755 ||  || — || September 30, 2006 || Mount Lemmon || Mount Lemmon Survey || — || align=right | 1.1 km || 
|-id=756 bgcolor=#d6d6d6
| 161756 ||  || — || September 30, 2006 || Catalina || CSS || — || align=right | 3.7 km || 
|-id=757 bgcolor=#fefefe
| 161757 || 2006 TH || — || October 2, 2006 || RAS || A. Lowe || V || align=right | 1.1 km || 
|-id=758 bgcolor=#E9E9E9
| 161758 ||  || — || October 11, 2006 || Kitt Peak || Spacewatch || — || align=right | 2.8 km || 
|-id=759 bgcolor=#E9E9E9
| 161759 ||  || — || October 11, 2006 || Kitt Peak || Spacewatch || HNS || align=right | 1.7 km || 
|-id=760 bgcolor=#fefefe
| 161760 ||  || — || October 12, 2006 || Kitt Peak || Spacewatch || — || align=right | 1.1 km || 
|-id=761 bgcolor=#d6d6d6
| 161761 ||  || — || October 12, 2006 || Kitt Peak || Spacewatch || — || align=right | 4.7 km || 
|-id=762 bgcolor=#d6d6d6
| 161762 ||  || — || October 12, 2006 || Kitt Peak || Spacewatch || — || align=right | 4.9 km || 
|-id=763 bgcolor=#fefefe
| 161763 ||  || — || October 12, 2006 || Kitt Peak || Spacewatch || — || align=right | 1.5 km || 
|-id=764 bgcolor=#d6d6d6
| 161764 ||  || — || October 12, 2006 || Palomar || NEAT || EOS || align=right | 4.8 km || 
|-id=765 bgcolor=#d6d6d6
| 161765 ||  || — || October 12, 2006 || Palomar || NEAT || — || align=right | 5.7 km || 
|-id=766 bgcolor=#d6d6d6
| 161766 ||  || — || October 13, 2006 || Kitt Peak || Spacewatch || — || align=right | 5.0 km || 
|-id=767 bgcolor=#fefefe
| 161767 ||  || — || October 10, 2006 || Palomar || NEAT || — || align=right | 1.3 km || 
|-id=768 bgcolor=#d6d6d6
| 161768 ||  || — || October 10, 2006 || Palomar || NEAT || — || align=right | 3.6 km || 
|-id=769 bgcolor=#E9E9E9
| 161769 ||  || — || October 11, 2006 || Kitt Peak || Spacewatch || — || align=right | 1.5 km || 
|-id=770 bgcolor=#E9E9E9
| 161770 ||  || — || October 11, 2006 || Palomar || NEAT || — || align=right | 1.7 km || 
|-id=771 bgcolor=#d6d6d6
| 161771 ||  || — || October 13, 2006 || Kitt Peak || Spacewatch || — || align=right | 4.4 km || 
|-id=772 bgcolor=#fefefe
| 161772 ||  || — || October 13, 2006 || Kitt Peak || Spacewatch || V || align=right | 1.0 km || 
|-id=773 bgcolor=#E9E9E9
| 161773 ||  || — || October 13, 2006 || Kitt Peak || Spacewatch || — || align=right | 2.3 km || 
|-id=774 bgcolor=#d6d6d6
| 161774 ||  || — || October 13, 2006 || Kitt Peak || Spacewatch || — || align=right | 6.3 km || 
|-id=775 bgcolor=#FA8072
| 161775 ||  || — || October 1, 2006 || Siding Spring || SSS || PHO || align=right | 1.8 km || 
|-id=776 bgcolor=#d6d6d6
| 161776 ||  || — || October 16, 2006 || Catalina || CSS || — || align=right | 4.4 km || 
|-id=777 bgcolor=#fefefe
| 161777 ||  || — || October 17, 2006 || Mount Lemmon || Mount Lemmon Survey || CLA || align=right | 2.1 km || 
|-id=778 bgcolor=#d6d6d6
| 161778 ||  || — || October 16, 2006 || Kitt Peak || Spacewatch || — || align=right | 4.8 km || 
|-id=779 bgcolor=#d6d6d6
| 161779 ||  || — || October 17, 2006 || Kitt Peak || Spacewatch || — || align=right | 5.4 km || 
|-id=780 bgcolor=#E9E9E9
| 161780 ||  || — || October 16, 2006 || Catalina || CSS || — || align=right | 1.8 km || 
|-id=781 bgcolor=#d6d6d6
| 161781 ||  || — || October 18, 2006 || Kitt Peak || Spacewatch || — || align=right | 6.4 km || 
|-id=782 bgcolor=#d6d6d6
| 161782 ||  || — || October 19, 2006 || Kitt Peak || Spacewatch || — || align=right | 4.5 km || 
|-id=783 bgcolor=#E9E9E9
| 161783 ||  || — || October 19, 2006 || Catalina || CSS || — || align=right | 4.3 km || 
|-id=784 bgcolor=#E9E9E9
| 161784 ||  || — || October 19, 2006 || Kitt Peak || Spacewatch || JUN || align=right | 1.9 km || 
|-id=785 bgcolor=#d6d6d6
| 161785 ||  || — || October 16, 2006 || Catalina || CSS || — || align=right | 4.9 km || 
|-id=786 bgcolor=#d6d6d6
| 161786 ||  || — || October 19, 2006 || Catalina || CSS || — || align=right | 5.8 km || 
|-id=787 bgcolor=#E9E9E9
| 161787 ||  || — || October 19, 2006 || Catalina || CSS || GEF || align=right | 4.5 km || 
|-id=788 bgcolor=#d6d6d6
| 161788 ||  || — || October 23, 2006 || Kitt Peak || Spacewatch || — || align=right | 5.8 km || 
|-id=789 bgcolor=#d6d6d6
| 161789 ||  || — || October 27, 2006 || Mount Lemmon || Mount Lemmon Survey || — || align=right | 3.5 km || 
|-id=790 bgcolor=#d6d6d6
| 161790 ||  || — || October 28, 2006 || Kitt Peak || Spacewatch || THM || align=right | 3.0 km || 
|-id=791 bgcolor=#d6d6d6
| 161791 ||  || — || October 28, 2006 || Catalina || CSS || — || align=right | 4.6 km || 
|-id=792 bgcolor=#fefefe
| 161792 ||  || — || October 28, 2006 || Kitt Peak || Spacewatch || — || align=right data-sort-value="0.91" | 910 m || 
|-id=793 bgcolor=#E9E9E9
| 161793 ||  || — || October 28, 2006 || Mount Lemmon || Mount Lemmon Survey || MAR || align=right | 1.8 km || 
|-id=794 bgcolor=#E9E9E9
| 161794 ||  || — || October 28, 2006 || Kitt Peak || Spacewatch || JUN || align=right | 2.0 km || 
|-id=795 bgcolor=#fefefe
| 161795 ||  || — || November 10, 2006 || Kitt Peak || Spacewatch || NYS || align=right data-sort-value="0.90" | 900 m || 
|-id=796 bgcolor=#fefefe
| 161796 ||  || — || November 11, 2006 || Catalina || CSS || NYS || align=right data-sort-value="0.85" | 850 m || 
|-id=797 bgcolor=#E9E9E9
| 161797 ||  || — || November 2, 2006 || Catalina || CSS || MAR || align=right | 2.2 km || 
|-id=798 bgcolor=#E9E9E9
| 161798 ||  || — || November 10, 2006 || Socorro || LINEAR || — || align=right | 3.6 km || 
|-id=799 bgcolor=#E9E9E9
| 161799 ||  || — || November 10, 2006 || Kitt Peak || Spacewatch || — || align=right | 1.9 km || 
|-id=800 bgcolor=#d6d6d6
| 161800 ||  || — || November 11, 2006 || Kitt Peak || Spacewatch || — || align=right | 3.6 km || 
|}

161801–161900 

|-bgcolor=#d6d6d6
| 161801 ||  || — || November 11, 2006 || Kitt Peak || Spacewatch || — || align=right | 3.7 km || 
|-id=802 bgcolor=#fefefe
| 161802 ||  || — || November 11, 2006 || Kitt Peak || Spacewatch || FLO || align=right | 1.0 km || 
|-id=803 bgcolor=#d6d6d6
| 161803 ||  || — || November 13, 2006 || Kitt Peak || Spacewatch || — || align=right | 5.1 km || 
|-id=804 bgcolor=#fefefe
| 161804 ||  || — || November 14, 2006 || Catalina || CSS || FLO || align=right | 1.2 km || 
|-id=805 bgcolor=#fefefe
| 161805 ||  || — || November 14, 2006 || Kitt Peak || Spacewatch || — || align=right | 1.3 km || 
|-id=806 bgcolor=#fefefe
| 161806 ||  || — || November 15, 2006 || Mount Lemmon || Mount Lemmon Survey || — || align=right | 1.3 km || 
|-id=807 bgcolor=#fefefe
| 161807 ||  || — || November 10, 2006 || Kitt Peak || Spacewatch || MAS || align=right | 1.0 km || 
|-id=808 bgcolor=#E9E9E9
| 161808 ||  || — || November 14, 2006 || Kitt Peak || Spacewatch || AST || align=right | 2.8 km || 
|-id=809 bgcolor=#d6d6d6
| 161809 ||  || — || November 15, 2006 || Mount Lemmon || Mount Lemmon Survey || KOR || align=right | 2.2 km || 
|-id=810 bgcolor=#fefefe
| 161810 ||  || — || November 15, 2006 || Catalina || CSS || NYS || align=right data-sort-value="0.98" | 980 m || 
|-id=811 bgcolor=#d6d6d6
| 161811 ||  || — || November 14, 2006 || Mount Lemmon || Mount Lemmon Survey || TIR || align=right | 3.5 km || 
|-id=812 bgcolor=#fefefe
| 161812 ||  || — || November 17, 2006 || Mount Lemmon || Mount Lemmon Survey || V || align=right | 1.0 km || 
|-id=813 bgcolor=#fefefe
| 161813 ||  || — || November 18, 2006 || Socorro || LINEAR || NYS || align=right | 1.3 km || 
|-id=814 bgcolor=#d6d6d6
| 161814 ||  || — || November 22, 2006 || 7300 Observatory || W. K. Y. Yeung || — || align=right | 3.4 km || 
|-id=815 bgcolor=#fefefe
| 161815 ||  || — || November 24, 2006 || Trois-Rivières || Cégep de Trois-Rivières Obs. || — || align=right | 1.2 km || 
|-id=816 bgcolor=#E9E9E9
| 161816 ||  || — || November 16, 2006 || Socorro || LINEAR || — || align=right | 2.9 km || 
|-id=817 bgcolor=#d6d6d6
| 161817 ||  || — || November 17, 2006 || Mount Lemmon || Mount Lemmon Survey || — || align=right | 6.3 km || 
|-id=818 bgcolor=#fefefe
| 161818 ||  || — || November 18, 2006 || Socorro || LINEAR || — || align=right | 1.1 km || 
|-id=819 bgcolor=#fefefe
| 161819 ||  || — || November 18, 2006 || Socorro || LINEAR || — || align=right | 1.8 km || 
|-id=820 bgcolor=#E9E9E9
| 161820 ||  || — || November 18, 2006 || Socorro || LINEAR || — || align=right | 6.4 km || 
|-id=821 bgcolor=#fefefe
| 161821 ||  || — || November 19, 2006 || Catalina || CSS || — || align=right | 1.5 km || 
|-id=822 bgcolor=#E9E9E9
| 161822 ||  || — || November 19, 2006 || Kitt Peak || Spacewatch || — || align=right | 5.6 km || 
|-id=823 bgcolor=#E9E9E9
| 161823 ||  || — || November 19, 2006 || Kitt Peak || Spacewatch || — || align=right | 3.0 km || 
|-id=824 bgcolor=#d6d6d6
| 161824 ||  || — || November 17, 2006 || Kitt Peak || Spacewatch || — || align=right | 5.6 km || 
|-id=825 bgcolor=#E9E9E9
| 161825 ||  || — || November 18, 2006 || Socorro || LINEAR || — || align=right | 2.1 km || 
|-id=826 bgcolor=#E9E9E9
| 161826 ||  || — || November 20, 2006 || Kitt Peak || Spacewatch || — || align=right | 3.1 km || 
|-id=827 bgcolor=#E9E9E9
| 161827 ||  || — || November 21, 2006 || Socorro || LINEAR || — || align=right | 3.6 km || 
|-id=828 bgcolor=#E9E9E9
| 161828 ||  || — || November 23, 2006 || Mount Lemmon || Mount Lemmon Survey || WIT || align=right | 1.5 km || 
|-id=829 bgcolor=#d6d6d6
| 161829 ||  || — || December 9, 2006 || Palomar || NEAT || — || align=right | 4.8 km || 
|-id=830 bgcolor=#d6d6d6
| 161830 ||  || — || December 12, 2006 || Catalina || CSS || HYG || align=right | 4.4 km || 
|-id=831 bgcolor=#d6d6d6
| 161831 ||  || — || December 10, 2006 || Kitt Peak || Spacewatch || TIR || align=right | 3.9 km || 
|-id=832 bgcolor=#d6d6d6
| 161832 ||  || — || December 11, 2006 || Kitt Peak || Spacewatch || — || align=right | 3.0 km || 
|-id=833 bgcolor=#d6d6d6
| 161833 ||  || — || December 13, 2006 || Mount Lemmon || Mount Lemmon Survey || — || align=right | 3.8 km || 
|-id=834 bgcolor=#d6d6d6
| 161834 ||  || — || December 13, 2006 || Mount Lemmon || Mount Lemmon Survey || — || align=right | 3.0 km || 
|-id=835 bgcolor=#fefefe
| 161835 Barbmcclintock ||  ||  || December 13, 2006 || Mount Lemmon || Mount Lemmon Survey || — || align=right | 1.3 km || 
|-id=836 bgcolor=#d6d6d6
| 161836 ||  || — || December 14, 2006 || Socorro || LINEAR || LIX || align=right | 6.4 km || 
|-id=837 bgcolor=#d6d6d6
| 161837 ||  || — || December 11, 2006 || Catalina || CSS || SAN || align=right | 2.7 km || 
|-id=838 bgcolor=#d6d6d6
| 161838 ||  || — || December 13, 2006 || Mount Lemmon || Mount Lemmon Survey || — || align=right | 5.6 km || 
|-id=839 bgcolor=#E9E9E9
| 161839 ||  || — || December 20, 2006 || Palomar || NEAT || — || align=right | 2.1 km || 
|-id=840 bgcolor=#E9E9E9
| 161840 ||  || — || December 21, 2006 || Kitt Peak || Spacewatch || — || align=right | 3.9 km || 
|-id=841 bgcolor=#d6d6d6
| 161841 ||  || — || December 23, 2006 || Mount Lemmon || Mount Lemmon Survey || EOS || align=right | 3.0 km || 
|-id=842 bgcolor=#d6d6d6
| 161842 ||  || — || January 9, 2007 || Kitt Peak || Spacewatch || AEG || align=right | 6.5 km || 
|-id=843 bgcolor=#d6d6d6
| 161843 ||  || — || January 9, 2007 || Palomar || NEAT || — || align=right | 4.1 km || 
|-id=844 bgcolor=#d6d6d6
| 161844 ||  || — || January 8, 2007 || Mount Lemmon || Mount Lemmon Survey || — || align=right | 4.9 km || 
|-id=845 bgcolor=#E9E9E9
| 161845 ||  || — || January 9, 2007 || Catalina || CSS || — || align=right | 2.0 km || 
|-id=846 bgcolor=#fefefe
| 161846 ||  || — || January 10, 2007 || Mount Lemmon || Mount Lemmon Survey || MAS || align=right | 1.1 km || 
|-id=847 bgcolor=#E9E9E9
| 161847 ||  || — || January 15, 2007 || Catalina || CSS || WIT || align=right | 1.4 km || 
|-id=848 bgcolor=#E9E9E9
| 161848 ||  || — || January 15, 2007 || Anderson Mesa || LONEOS || — || align=right | 2.9 km || 
|-id=849 bgcolor=#d6d6d6
| 161849 ||  || — || January 15, 2007 || Catalina || CSS || — || align=right | 3.8 km || 
|-id=850 bgcolor=#E9E9E9
| 161850 ||  || — || January 24, 2007 || RAS || A. Lowe || — || align=right | 4.3 km || 
|-id=851 bgcolor=#fefefe
| 161851 ||  || — || January 16, 2007 || Catalina || CSS || FLO || align=right data-sort-value="0.95" | 950 m || 
|-id=852 bgcolor=#E9E9E9
| 161852 ||  || — || January 17, 2007 || Mount Lemmon || Mount Lemmon Survey || — || align=right | 1.7 km || 
|-id=853 bgcolor=#E9E9E9
| 161853 ||  || — || January 23, 2007 || Anderson Mesa || LONEOS || — || align=right | 3.7 km || 
|-id=854 bgcolor=#E9E9E9
| 161854 ||  || — || January 24, 2007 || Socorro || LINEAR || — || align=right | 3.7 km || 
|-id=855 bgcolor=#E9E9E9
| 161855 ||  || — || January 24, 2007 || Catalina || CSS || MRX || align=right | 1.4 km || 
|-id=856 bgcolor=#d6d6d6
| 161856 ||  || — || January 24, 2007 || Mount Lemmon || Mount Lemmon Survey || THM || align=right | 2.8 km || 
|-id=857 bgcolor=#d6d6d6
| 161857 ||  || — || January 24, 2007 || Mount Lemmon || Mount Lemmon Survey || — || align=right | 3.7 km || 
|-id=858 bgcolor=#d6d6d6
| 161858 ||  || — || January 24, 2007 || Catalina || CSS || — || align=right | 4.9 km || 
|-id=859 bgcolor=#fefefe
| 161859 ||  || — || January 24, 2007 || Catalina || CSS || NYS || align=right | 1.1 km || 
|-id=860 bgcolor=#d6d6d6
| 161860 ||  || — || January 24, 2007 || Catalina || CSS || — || align=right | 4.7 km || 
|-id=861 bgcolor=#fefefe
| 161861 ||  || — || January 25, 2007 || Catalina || CSS || — || align=right | 1.1 km || 
|-id=862 bgcolor=#d6d6d6
| 161862 ||  || — || January 17, 2007 || Kitt Peak || Spacewatch || BRA || align=right | 1.7 km || 
|-id=863 bgcolor=#E9E9E9
| 161863 ||  || — || January 23, 2007 || Socorro || LINEAR || — || align=right | 4.9 km || 
|-id=864 bgcolor=#E9E9E9
| 161864 ||  || — || January 24, 2007 || Kitt Peak || Spacewatch || PAD || align=right | 2.5 km || 
|-id=865 bgcolor=#E9E9E9
| 161865 ||  || — || January 26, 2007 || Anderson Mesa || LONEOS || — || align=right | 3.0 km || 
|-id=866 bgcolor=#E9E9E9
| 161866 ||  || — || January 27, 2007 || Mount Lemmon || Mount Lemmon Survey || — || align=right | 4.7 km || 
|-id=867 bgcolor=#E9E9E9
| 161867 || 2007 CD || — || February 5, 2007 || RAS || A. Lowe || EUN || align=right | 1.9 km || 
|-id=868 bgcolor=#d6d6d6
| 161868 || 2007 CQ || — || February 5, 2007 || Palomar || NEAT || — || align=right | 6.8 km || 
|-id=869 bgcolor=#d6d6d6
| 161869 ||  || — || February 8, 2007 || RAS || A. Lowe || — || align=right | 4.8 km || 
|-id=870 bgcolor=#d6d6d6
| 161870 ||  || — || February 6, 2007 || Kitt Peak || Spacewatch || — || align=right | 4.0 km || 
|-id=871 bgcolor=#fefefe
| 161871 ||  || — || February 6, 2007 || Kitt Peak || Spacewatch || NYS || align=right data-sort-value="0.92" | 920 m || 
|-id=872 bgcolor=#d6d6d6
| 161872 ||  || — || February 7, 2007 || Mount Lemmon || Mount Lemmon Survey || — || align=right | 4.1 km || 
|-id=873 bgcolor=#d6d6d6
| 161873 ||  || — || February 7, 2007 || Catalina || CSS || EUP || align=right | 6.7 km || 
|-id=874 bgcolor=#E9E9E9
| 161874 ||  || — || February 6, 2007 || Palomar || NEAT || — || align=right | 4.2 km || 
|-id=875 bgcolor=#fefefe
| 161875 ||  || — || February 8, 2007 || Kitt Peak || Spacewatch || — || align=right | 1.6 km || 
|-id=876 bgcolor=#d6d6d6
| 161876 ||  || — || February 6, 2007 || Palomar || NEAT || EMA || align=right | 4.8 km || 
|-id=877 bgcolor=#d6d6d6
| 161877 ||  || — || February 6, 2007 || Palomar || NEAT || — || align=right | 3.4 km || 
|-id=878 bgcolor=#fefefe
| 161878 ||  || — || February 6, 2007 || Mount Lemmon || Mount Lemmon Survey || — || align=right data-sort-value="0.98" | 980 m || 
|-id=879 bgcolor=#fefefe
| 161879 ||  || — || February 7, 2007 || Kitt Peak || Spacewatch || — || align=right data-sort-value="0.89" | 890 m || 
|-id=880 bgcolor=#E9E9E9
| 161880 ||  || — || February 8, 2007 || Palomar || NEAT || — || align=right | 1.4 km || 
|-id=881 bgcolor=#E9E9E9
| 161881 ||  || — || February 8, 2007 || Palomar || NEAT || — || align=right | 2.6 km || 
|-id=882 bgcolor=#E9E9E9
| 161882 ||  || — || February 8, 2007 || Mount Lemmon || Mount Lemmon Survey || — || align=right | 3.2 km || 
|-id=883 bgcolor=#fefefe
| 161883 ||  || — || February 8, 2007 || Palomar || NEAT || FLO || align=right data-sort-value="0.94" | 940 m || 
|-id=884 bgcolor=#d6d6d6
| 161884 ||  || — || February 10, 2007 || Catalina || CSS || TEL || align=right | 2.4 km || 
|-id=885 bgcolor=#fefefe
| 161885 ||  || — || February 15, 2007 || Catalina || CSS || NYS || align=right | 1.1 km || 
|-id=886 bgcolor=#E9E9E9
| 161886 ||  || — || February 10, 2007 || Palomar || NEAT || — || align=right | 2.2 km || 
|-id=887 bgcolor=#E9E9E9
| 161887 ||  || — || February 10, 2007 || Catalina || CSS || — || align=right | 3.4 km || 
|-id=888 bgcolor=#E9E9E9
| 161888 ||  || — || February 13, 2007 || Socorro || LINEAR || HNS || align=right | 2.3 km || 
|-id=889 bgcolor=#fefefe
| 161889 ||  || — || February 16, 2007 || Mount Lemmon || Mount Lemmon Survey || — || align=right | 1.6 km || 
|-id=890 bgcolor=#E9E9E9
| 161890 ||  || — || February 16, 2007 || Mount Lemmon || Mount Lemmon Survey || — || align=right | 1.1 km || 
|-id=891 bgcolor=#d6d6d6
| 161891 ||  || — || February 17, 2007 || Kitt Peak || Spacewatch || — || align=right | 3.4 km || 
|-id=892 bgcolor=#E9E9E9
| 161892 ||  || — || February 17, 2007 || Kitt Peak || Spacewatch || — || align=right | 1.1 km || 
|-id=893 bgcolor=#d6d6d6
| 161893 ||  || — || February 17, 2007 || Kitt Peak || Spacewatch || — || align=right | 3.3 km || 
|-id=894 bgcolor=#E9E9E9
| 161894 ||  || — || February 17, 2007 || Kitt Peak || Spacewatch || — || align=right | 1.3 km || 
|-id=895 bgcolor=#d6d6d6
| 161895 ||  || — || February 17, 2007 || Kitt Peak || Spacewatch || — || align=right | 3.9 km || 
|-id=896 bgcolor=#E9E9E9
| 161896 ||  || — || February 17, 2007 || Kitt Peak || Spacewatch || HEN || align=right | 1.3 km || 
|-id=897 bgcolor=#fefefe
| 161897 ||  || — || February 21, 2007 || Mount Lemmon || Mount Lemmon Survey || FLO || align=right | 1.6 km || 
|-id=898 bgcolor=#fefefe
| 161898 ||  || — || February 17, 2007 || Palomar || NEAT || — || align=right | 1.3 km || 
|-id=899 bgcolor=#fefefe
| 161899 ||  || — || February 19, 2007 || Mount Lemmon || Mount Lemmon Survey || — || align=right data-sort-value="0.97" | 970 m || 
|-id=900 bgcolor=#fefefe
| 161900 ||  || — || February 21, 2007 || Mount Lemmon || Mount Lemmon Survey || MAS || align=right data-sort-value="0.90" | 900 m || 
|}

161901–162000 

|-bgcolor=#fefefe
| 161901 ||  || — || February 17, 2007 || Socorro || LINEAR || — || align=right | 2.0 km || 
|-id=902 bgcolor=#d6d6d6
| 161902 ||  || — || February 17, 2007 || Mount Lemmon || Mount Lemmon Survey || — || align=right | 5.6 km || 
|-id=903 bgcolor=#fefefe
| 161903 ||  || — || February 21, 2007 || Kitt Peak || Spacewatch || NYS || align=right | 1.2 km || 
|-id=904 bgcolor=#E9E9E9
| 161904 ||  || — || February 21, 2007 || Kitt Peak || Spacewatch || — || align=right | 2.6 km || 
|-id=905 bgcolor=#fefefe
| 161905 ||  || — || February 22, 2007 || Kitt Peak || Spacewatch || NYS || align=right | 1.9 km || 
|-id=906 bgcolor=#fefefe
| 161906 ||  || — || February 22, 2007 || Anderson Mesa || LONEOS || — || align=right | 1.1 km || 
|-id=907 bgcolor=#fefefe
| 161907 ||  || — || February 21, 2007 || Socorro || LINEAR || — || align=right | 1.2 km || 
|-id=908 bgcolor=#E9E9E9
| 161908 ||  || — || February 23, 2007 || Kitt Peak || Spacewatch || — || align=right | 2.6 km || 
|-id=909 bgcolor=#E9E9E9
| 161909 ||  || — || February 23, 2007 || Catalina || CSS || — || align=right | 1.7 km || 
|-id=910 bgcolor=#fefefe
| 161910 ||  || — || February 21, 2007 || Kitt Peak || Spacewatch || — || align=right | 4.4 km || 
|-id=911 bgcolor=#d6d6d6
| 161911 ||  || — || February 23, 2007 || Mount Lemmon || Mount Lemmon Survey || THM || align=right | 4.2 km || 
|-id=912 bgcolor=#fefefe
| 161912 ||  || — || February 23, 2007 || Kitt Peak || Spacewatch || NYS || align=right data-sort-value="0.98" | 980 m || 
|-id=913 bgcolor=#fefefe
| 161913 Hunyadi|| 2007 EA || — || March 5, 2007 || Piszkéstető || K. Sárneczky || — || align=right data-sort-value="0.91" | 910 m || 
|-id=914 bgcolor=#fefefe
| 161914 ||  || — || March 9, 2007 || Mount Lemmon || Mount Lemmon Survey || NYS || align=right data-sort-value="0.88" | 880 m || 
|-id=915 bgcolor=#d6d6d6
| 161915 ||  || — || March 10, 2007 || Mount Lemmon || Mount Lemmon Survey || — || align=right | 3.8 km || 
|-id=916 bgcolor=#C2FFFF
| 161916 ||  || — || March 10, 2007 || Palomar || NEAT || L5 || align=right | 13 km || 
|-id=917 bgcolor=#E9E9E9
| 161917 ||  || — || March 11, 2007 || Catalina || CSS || — || align=right | 2.7 km || 
|-id=918 bgcolor=#fefefe
| 161918 ||  || — || March 11, 2007 || Mount Lemmon || Mount Lemmon Survey || V || align=right data-sort-value="0.85" | 850 m || 
|-id=919 bgcolor=#d6d6d6
| 161919 ||  || — || March 9, 2007 || Kitt Peak || Spacewatch || KOR || align=right | 2.2 km || 
|-id=920 bgcolor=#fefefe
| 161920 ||  || — || March 10, 2007 || Mount Lemmon || Mount Lemmon Survey || — || align=right data-sort-value="0.98" | 980 m || 
|-id=921 bgcolor=#fefefe
| 161921 ||  || — || March 14, 2007 || RAS || A. Lowe || V || align=right | 1.2 km || 
|-id=922 bgcolor=#d6d6d6
| 161922 ||  || — || March 14, 2007 || RAS || A. Lowe || — || align=right | 5.8 km || 
|-id=923 bgcolor=#fefefe
| 161923 ||  || — || March 13, 2007 || Mount Lemmon || Mount Lemmon Survey || MAS || align=right data-sort-value="0.89" | 890 m || 
|-id=924 bgcolor=#d6d6d6
| 161924 ||  || — || March 13, 2007 || Catalina || CSS || — || align=right | 5.7 km || 
|-id=925 bgcolor=#d6d6d6
| 161925 ||  || — || March 11, 2007 || Kitt Peak || Spacewatch || — || align=right | 5.3 km || 
|-id=926 bgcolor=#fefefe
| 161926 ||  || — || March 11, 2007 || Kitt Peak || Spacewatch || NYS || align=right | 1.0 km || 
|-id=927 bgcolor=#d6d6d6
| 161927 ||  || — || March 13, 2007 || Mount Lemmon || Mount Lemmon Survey || — || align=right | 4.3 km || 
|-id=928 bgcolor=#E9E9E9
| 161928 ||  || — || March 9, 2007 || Mount Lemmon || Mount Lemmon Survey || — || align=right | 2.7 km || 
|-id=929 bgcolor=#E9E9E9
| 161929 ||  || — || March 9, 2007 || Mount Lemmon || Mount Lemmon Survey || — || align=right | 2.1 km || 
|-id=930 bgcolor=#d6d6d6
| 161930 ||  || — || March 14, 2007 || Siding Spring || SSS || — || align=right | 5.9 km || 
|-id=931 bgcolor=#d6d6d6
| 161931 ||  || — || March 11, 2007 || Catalina || CSS || TIR || align=right | 5.2 km || 
|-id=932 bgcolor=#E9E9E9
| 161932 ||  || — || March 14, 2007 || Kitt Peak || Spacewatch || — || align=right | 1.9 km || 
|-id=933 bgcolor=#fefefe
| 161933 ||  || — || March 14, 2007 || Kitt Peak || Spacewatch || — || align=right | 1.0 km || 
|-id=934 bgcolor=#E9E9E9
| 161934 ||  || — || March 14, 2007 || Mount Lemmon || Mount Lemmon Survey || JUN || align=right | 1.3 km || 
|-id=935 bgcolor=#fefefe
| 161935 ||  || — || March 10, 2007 || Mount Lemmon || Mount Lemmon Survey || MAS || align=right data-sort-value="0.98" | 980 m || 
|-id=936 bgcolor=#E9E9E9
| 161936 ||  || — || March 20, 2007 || Kitt Peak || Spacewatch || — || align=right | 2.8 km || 
|-id=937 bgcolor=#fefefe
| 161937 ||  || — || March 25, 2007 || Mount Lemmon || Mount Lemmon Survey || NYS || align=right data-sort-value="0.76" | 760 m || 
|-id=938 bgcolor=#d6d6d6
| 161938 ||  || — || March 26, 2007 || Kitt Peak || Spacewatch || — || align=right | 5.6 km || 
|-id=939 bgcolor=#d6d6d6
| 161939 ||  || — || March 25, 2007 || Catalina || CSS || THB || align=right | 4.0 km || 
|-id=940 bgcolor=#E9E9E9
| 161940 ||  || — || March 26, 2007 || Mount Lemmon || Mount Lemmon Survey || INO || align=right | 2.1 km || 
|-id=941 bgcolor=#fefefe
| 161941 ||  || — || March 18, 2007 || Kitt Peak || Spacewatch || — || align=right | 1.1 km || 
|-id=942 bgcolor=#E9E9E9
| 161942 ||  || — || April 10, 2007 || RAS || A. Lowe || EUN || align=right | 2.3 km || 
|-id=943 bgcolor=#E9E9E9
| 161943 ||  || — || April 11, 2007 || Catalina || CSS || — || align=right | 5.2 km || 
|-id=944 bgcolor=#E9E9E9
| 161944 ||  || — || April 11, 2007 || Mount Lemmon || Mount Lemmon Survey || — || align=right | 2.6 km || 
|-id=945 bgcolor=#fefefe
| 161945 ||  || — || April 11, 2007 || Mount Lemmon || Mount Lemmon Survey || NYS || align=right data-sort-value="0.84" | 840 m || 
|-id=946 bgcolor=#d6d6d6
| 161946 ||  || — || April 11, 2007 || Kitt Peak || Spacewatch || — || align=right | 3.9 km || 
|-id=947 bgcolor=#E9E9E9
| 161947 ||  || — || April 12, 2007 || Siding Spring || SSS || — || align=right | 6.3 km || 
|-id=948 bgcolor=#d6d6d6
| 161948 ||  || — || April 13, 2007 || Siding Spring || SSS || — || align=right | 4.4 km || 
|-id=949 bgcolor=#d6d6d6
| 161949 ||  || — || April 14, 2007 || Kitt Peak || Spacewatch || — || align=right | 4.3 km || 
|-id=950 bgcolor=#fefefe
| 161950 ||  || — || April 14, 2007 || Kitt Peak || Spacewatch || — || align=right | 1.1 km || 
|-id=951 bgcolor=#E9E9E9
| 161951 ||  || — || April 14, 2007 || Kitt Peak || Spacewatch || — || align=right | 2.3 km || 
|-id=952 bgcolor=#d6d6d6
| 161952 ||  || — || April 15, 2007 || Kitt Peak || Spacewatch || — || align=right | 5.0 km || 
|-id=953 bgcolor=#fefefe
| 161953 ||  || — || April 16, 2007 || Catalina || CSS || V || align=right | 1.1 km || 
|-id=954 bgcolor=#fefefe
| 161954 ||  || — || April 16, 2007 || Catalina || CSS || — || align=right | 1.0 km || 
|-id=955 bgcolor=#fefefe
| 161955 ||  || — || April 18, 2007 || Kitt Peak || Spacewatch || — || align=right | 1.0 km || 
|-id=956 bgcolor=#E9E9E9
| 161956 ||  || — || April 20, 2007 || Kitt Peak || Spacewatch || — || align=right | 1.6 km || 
|-id=957 bgcolor=#d6d6d6
| 161957 ||  || — || April 20, 2007 || Mount Lemmon || Mount Lemmon Survey || — || align=right | 9.5 km || 
|-id=958 bgcolor=#d6d6d6
| 161958 ||  || — || April 20, 2007 || Kitt Peak || Spacewatch || TIR || align=right | 3.3 km || 
|-id=959 bgcolor=#fefefe
| 161959 ||  || — || April 20, 2007 || Kitt Peak || Spacewatch || MAS || align=right | 1.3 km || 
|-id=960 bgcolor=#fefefe
| 161960 ||  || — || April 22, 2007 || Mount Lemmon || Mount Lemmon Survey || V || align=right data-sort-value="0.89" | 890 m || 
|-id=961 bgcolor=#d6d6d6
| 161961 ||  || — || April 22, 2007 || Catalina || CSS || — || align=right | 6.3 km || 
|-id=962 bgcolor=#E9E9E9
| 161962 Galchyn ||  ||  || April 27, 2007 || Andrushivka || Andrushivka Obs. || — || align=right | 4.4 km || 
|-id=963 bgcolor=#d6d6d6
| 161963 ||  || — || April 24, 2007 || Kitt Peak || Spacewatch || — || align=right | 5.2 km || 
|-id=964 bgcolor=#E9E9E9
| 161964 ||  || — || April 24, 2007 || Kitt Peak || Spacewatch || JUN || align=right data-sort-value="0.98" | 980 m || 
|-id=965 bgcolor=#E9E9E9
| 161965 ||  || — || April 26, 2007 || Kitt Peak || Spacewatch || EUN || align=right | 2.0 km || 
|-id=966 bgcolor=#d6d6d6
| 161966 ||  || — || May 6, 2007 || Kitt Peak || Spacewatch || — || align=right | 7.5 km || 
|-id=967 bgcolor=#d6d6d6
| 161967 ||  || — || May 10, 2007 || Kitt Peak || Spacewatch || — || align=right | 5.1 km || 
|-id=968 bgcolor=#E9E9E9
| 161968 ||  || — || May 12, 2007 || Kitt Peak || Spacewatch || — || align=right | 3.5 km || 
|-id=969 bgcolor=#E9E9E9
| 161969 ||  || — || May 12, 2007 || Kitt Peak || Spacewatch || — || align=right | 2.1 km || 
|-id=970 bgcolor=#E9E9E9
| 161970 ||  || — || May 10, 2007 || Kitt Peak || Spacewatch || — || align=right | 2.8 km || 
|-id=971 bgcolor=#fefefe
| 161971 ||  || — || May 12, 2007 || Mount Lemmon || Mount Lemmon Survey || FLO || align=right | 1.5 km || 
|-id=972 bgcolor=#FA8072
| 161972 ||  || — || May 10, 2007 || Mount Lemmon || Mount Lemmon Survey || — || align=right | 1.1 km || 
|-id=973 bgcolor=#E9E9E9
| 161973 ||  || — || May 24, 2007 || Mount Lemmon || Mount Lemmon Survey || — || align=right | 2.8 km || 
|-id=974 bgcolor=#E9E9E9
| 161974 ||  || — || May 16, 2007 || Siding Spring || SSS || — || align=right | 2.9 km || 
|-id=975 bgcolor=#E9E9E9
| 161975 Kincsem || 2007 LO ||  || June 8, 2007 || Piszkéstető || K. Sárneczky || — || align=right | 5.7 km || 
|-id=976 bgcolor=#d6d6d6
| 161976 ||  || — || June 7, 2007 || Kitt Peak || Spacewatch || — || align=right | 5.1 km || 
|-id=977 bgcolor=#E9E9E9
| 161977 ||  || — || June 8, 2007 || Catalina || CSS || — || align=right | 2.0 km || 
|-id=978 bgcolor=#fefefe
| 161978 ||  || — || June 10, 2007 || Kitt Peak || Spacewatch || — || align=right | 1.3 km || 
|-id=979 bgcolor=#fefefe
| 161979 ||  || — || June 23, 2007 || Kitt Peak || Spacewatch || — || align=right | 1.4 km || 
|-id=980 bgcolor=#fefefe
| 161980 ||  || — || July 18, 2007 || Chante-Perdrix || Chante-Perdrix Obs. || NYS || align=right | 1.3 km || 
|-id=981 bgcolor=#fefefe
| 161981 || 4745 P-L || — || September 24, 1960 || Palomar || PLS || NYS || align=right | 1.1 km || 
|-id=982 bgcolor=#fefefe
| 161982 || 6159 P-L || — || September 24, 1960 || Palomar || PLS || — || align=right | 1.4 km || 
|-id=983 bgcolor=#d6d6d6
| 161983 || 6236 P-L || — || September 24, 1960 || Palomar || PLS || URS || align=right | 5.5 km || 
|-id=984 bgcolor=#E9E9E9
| 161984 || 6515 P-L || — || September 24, 1960 || Palomar || PLS || — || align=right | 6.4 km || 
|-id=985 bgcolor=#fefefe
| 161985 || 1253 T-2 || — || September 29, 1973 || Palomar || PLS || — || align=right | 1.3 km || 
|-id=986 bgcolor=#E9E9E9
| 161986 || 3418 T-2 || — || September 30, 1973 || Palomar || PLS || — || align=right | 2.0 km || 
|-id=987 bgcolor=#E9E9E9
| 161987 || 2026 T-3 || — || October 16, 1977 || Palomar || PLS || — || align=right | 2.1 km || 
|-id=988 bgcolor=#E9E9E9
| 161988 || 4069 T-3 || — || October 16, 1977 || Palomar || PLS || — || align=right | 1.5 km || 
|-id=989 bgcolor=#FFC2E0
| 161989 Cacus || 1978 CA ||  || February 8, 1978 || La Silla || H.-E. Schuster || APO +1kmPHA || align=right | 1.9 km || 
|-id=990 bgcolor=#E9E9E9
| 161990 ||  || — || March 2, 1981 || Siding Spring || S. J. Bus || — || align=right | 2.0 km || 
|-id=991 bgcolor=#fefefe
| 161991 ||  || — || March 7, 1981 || Siding Spring || S. J. Bus || — || align=right | 1.2 km || 
|-id=992 bgcolor=#fefefe
| 161992 ||  || — || March 1, 1981 || Siding Spring || S. J. Bus || — || align=right | 1.3 km || 
|-id=993 bgcolor=#fefefe
| 161993 ||  || — || March 1, 1981 || Siding Spring || S. J. Bus || — || align=right | 1.5 km || 
|-id=994 bgcolor=#E9E9E9
| 161994 ||  || — || March 7, 1981 || Siding Spring || S. J. Bus || — || align=right | 3.4 km || 
|-id=995 bgcolor=#FFC2E0
| 161995 || 1983 LB || — || June 13, 1983 || Palomar || S. R. Swanson, E. F. Helin || AMO +1km || align=right | 1.2 km || 
|-id=996 bgcolor=#E9E9E9
| 161996 ||  || — || September 6, 1985 || La Silla || H. Debehogne || — || align=right | 3.8 km || 
|-id=997 bgcolor=#fefefe
| 161997 || 1987 AN || — || January 1, 1987 || La Silla || H. U. Nørgaard-Nielsen || NYS || align=right | 1.2 km || 
|-id=998 bgcolor=#FFC2E0
| 161998 || 1988 PA || — || August 9, 1988 || Palomar || J. Alu || AMO +1km || align=right | 1.1 km || 
|-id=999 bgcolor=#FFC2E0
| 161999 || 1989 RC || — || September 5, 1989 || Palomar || J. Alu, E. F. Helin || AMO || align=right data-sort-value="0.46" | 460 m || 
|-id=000 bgcolor=#FFC2E0
| 162000 || 1990 OS || — || July 21, 1990 || Palomar || E. F. Helin || APOPHAmoon || align=right data-sort-value="0.4" | 400 m || 
|}

References

External links 
 Discovery Circumstances: Numbered Minor Planets (160001)–(165000) (IAU Minor Planet Center)

0161